= Zheng Manuo =

Chinese Jesuit priest (1633–1673)

Zheng Manuo SJ
- 鄭瑪諾
- Born: 25 May 1633; Portuguese Macau
- Died: 26 May 1673 (aged 40); Beijing, Qing Empire
- Resting place: Zhalan Cemetery, Beijing
- Other name: Manoel de Siqueira / Sequiera / Sequeira
- Education: Novitiate of St. Andrea; Roman College; University of Bologna; University of Coimbra
- Occupation: Jesuit missionary
- Known for: First Chinese international student in Europe and first Chinese Jesuit priest

Zheng Manuo (Note: Simplified Chinese: 郑玛诺; traditional Chinese: 鄭瑪諾; pinyin: Zhèng Mǎnuò. Also known as Zheng Weixin and variations of Emmanuel or Manoel de Siqueira in Western sources.) SJ (25 May 1633 – 26 May 1673) was the first Chinese international student in Europe and the first Chinese Jesuit priest. At the age of twelve, Zheng left Macau with the French priest Alexandre de Rhodes in 1645 and reached Rome in 1650. Zheng studied first at the novitiate of Sant'Andrea in Rome. He then studied and taught at the Roman College from 1653 to 1660. Afterwards, he studied theology at the University of Bologna, and completed his studies at the University of Coimbra in Portugal in 1665, by which time he had also been ordained.

After Zheng left Europe in 1666, he worked as a missionary in India until 1668, when he was sent back to Macau due to the need of Chinese priests in China under the anti-Christian edict. In Macau, he studied a year of Chinese language. He then evangelized in Southern China from 1669 to 1671. When the anti-Christian edict was lifted, Zheng accompanied two foreign missionaries to Beijing. He contracted tuberculosis and died in the imperial capital in 1673 at the age of 40.

Zheng was buried at Zhalan Cemetery with other foreign missionaries. His tombstone, which contained Chinese and Latin inscriptions, was lost during the Cultural Revolution.

== Naming ==
=== In Western languages ===
Zheng's Portuguese given name is "Manoel". His Chinese given name "Manuo" is derived from it. Some historians put his given name as "Emmanuel", but other historians acknowledge both usages.

On the other hand, various sources give Zheng's Portuguese last name differently across several languages. Alexandre de Rhodes, the mentor of Zheng, called him "Emmanuel de Sequeira" in the Italian manuscript of his journal. Francis A. Rouleau claimed Zheng's last name is "de Siqueira" from different records and Zheng's own signature. He further claimed that the name "Sequeira" passed down from Zheng's Latin tombstone inscription. In his 1988 book Biographies of Figures in Chinese Catholic History (「中國天主教史人物傳」), Fang Hao called Zheng "Manoel de Sequiera". Nevertheless, Fang also cited several registries that use "Emmanuel de Siqueira" in his book.

=== In Chinese ===
Zheng's Chinese name is "Zheng Manuo" (simplified Chinese: 郑玛诺; traditional Chinese: 鄭瑪諾). However, there is not a consensus on his Chinese courtesy name: some sources put it as "惟信" (Wéi xìn), while others put it as "維信" (Wéi xìn). In his 2022 book The Chinese Vogue in Europe During the Eighteenth Century, Xu Minglong claimed that Zheng's original name was "Weixin".

There exist different romanizations of Zheng's Chinese names. Rouleau put Zheng's last name as "Cheng", his given name as "Ma-no", and his courtesy name as "Wei-hsin". George H. Dunne called Zheng "Chêng Wei-hsin" in a 1961 article.

== Biography ==
=== Early life ===
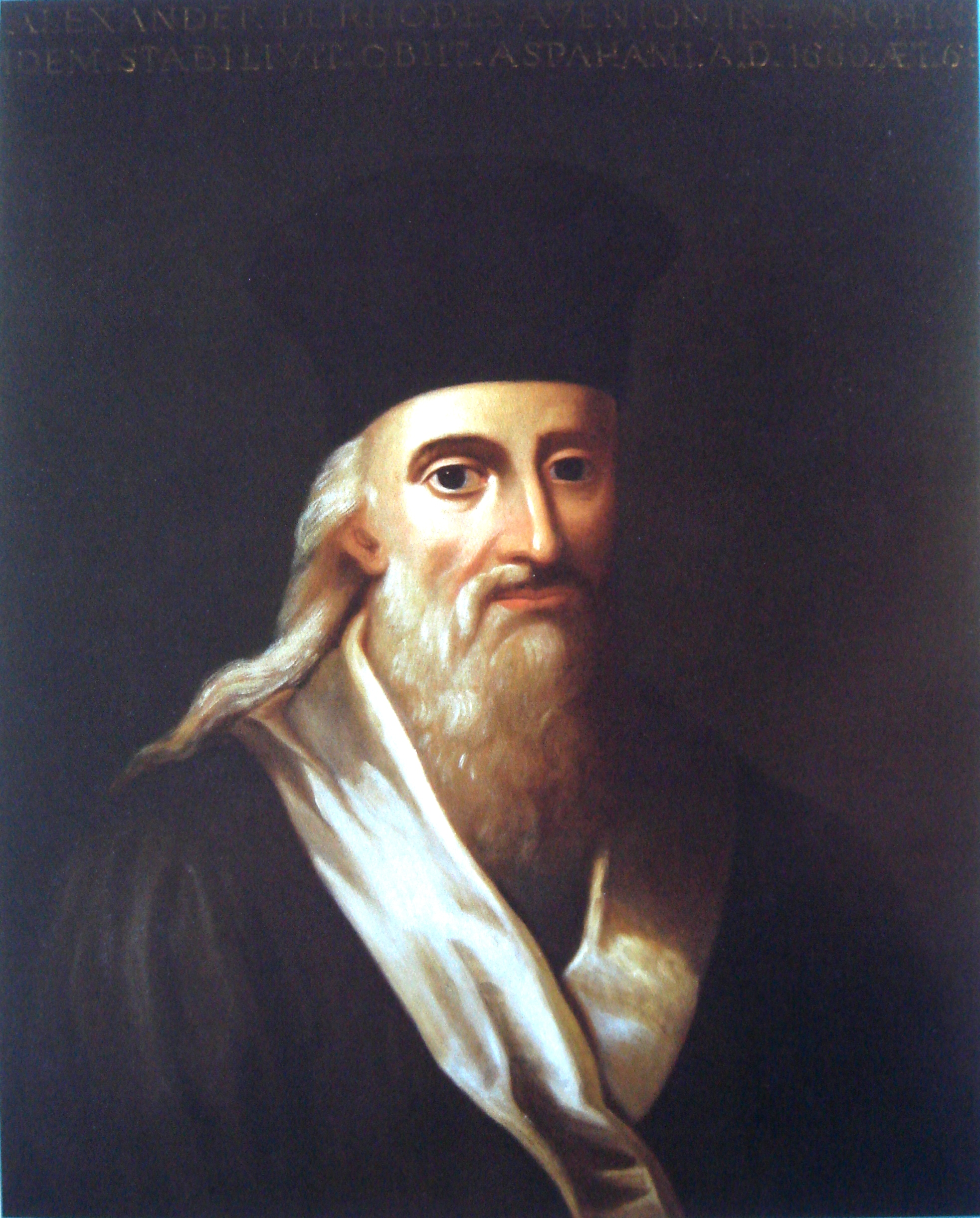
Alexandre de Rhodes (1593–1660), the Jesuit priest who brought Zheng to Rome

Zheng was born on 25 May 1633 in Macau. His father, Anthony, was a Chinese Catholic who was close with the Jesuit priest Alexandre de Rhodes. Zheng was baptized by de Rhodes.

Alexandre de Rhodes intended to travel to Europe to introduce the region of Vietnam to the Holy See. At the time, Jesuit missionaries from Japan were spreading Catholicism in the region. In 1645, de Rhodes suggested to the Jesuit superior at Macau that he could take children from China and Vietnam to study in Rome. The priest chose three boys, including Zheng from China, a boy from Tonkin and another boy from Cochinchina. Because the society had financial difficulties, the local superior only agreed to let de Rhodes depart with Zheng. Zheng's father gave consent to the arrangement.

Rouleau asserted that de Rhodes "almost certainly" hoped to nourish "a comprehensive program for the indigenation for the Annamite and south China missions" when he was selecting a candidate for the European studies. In his journal describing the trip, de Rhodes often referred to Zheng as mon petit Chinois ("my little Chinese"). He also praised Zheng, saying that the boy was "of very good nature and marvellous spirit".

==== Journey from Macau to Rome (1645–1650) ====
Alexandre de Rhodes and Zheng departed Macau on 20 December 1645. Zheng was twelve years old when he left. On 14 January 1646, the two reached Malacca. They were then captured by Dutch pirates and sent to Jakarta. After three months, they were released and landed at Goa. They then reached Hormuz on 1 March 1648 and began to travel on land. They journeyed through Persia and Armenia, and arrived in Yerevan on 1 September 1648.

According to de Rhodes, a group of Turkish people on the way thought Zheng as a Tartar Muslim, and planned to abduct the boy as soon as he enters the Ottoman Empire. Thus, de Rhodes placed Zheng at a Dominican monastery in Armenia. Zheng stayed there for six months and learned the Armenian language. He later entered Turkey, went through İzmir and reached Rome by the Mediterranean. He reunited with de Rhodes at the city in early 1650.

=== Studies in Europe ===
==== Studies in Rome (1651–1660) ====
Zheng was the first Chinese person to study abroad in Europe. On 17 October 1651, he entered the novitiate of Sant'Andrea in Rome. He was 18 years old at the time, and he only brought a few pieces of personal clothing. He studied under Domenico Vanni, the rector of the novitiate, and completed his noviceship in 1653.

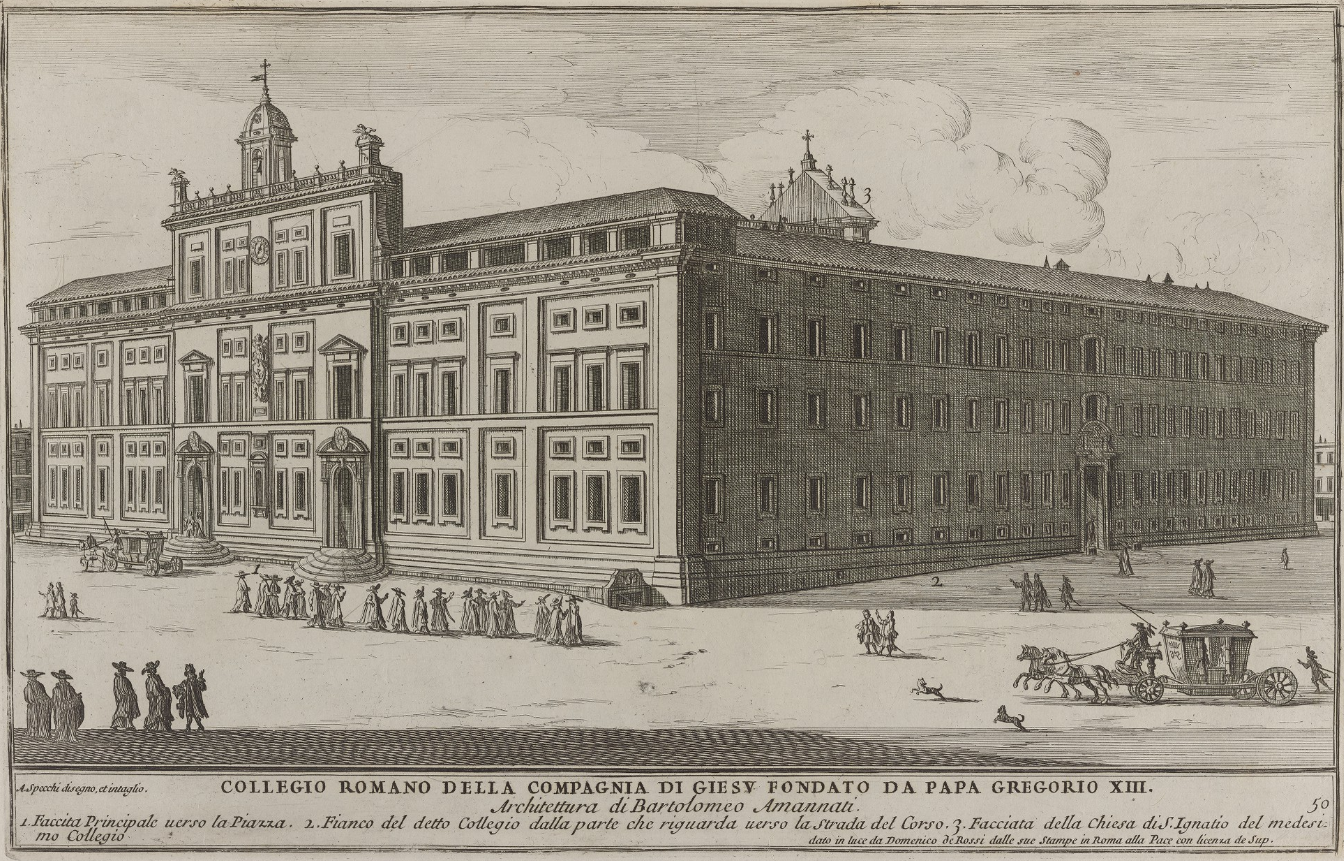
The Roman College in 1699. From 1653 to 1660, Zheng studied there for four years and taught there for three years.

In autumn 1653, Zheng made his Jesuit first vows and entered the Roman College. He first studied rhetorics from 1653 to 1654. He continued to study three years of philosophy, spending a year each on logic, natural theology, and metaphysics. Then, as a part of his regency (a period of teaching as a part of the Jesuit formation), he taught classics for three years at the Roman College. Rouleau observed that it was "unusual" for Zheng, a Chinese, to teach classics to Europeans. He suggested that Zheng's teaching position implied both that Zheng had completed his education successfully and that the college superiors did not make any exceptions for Zheng as a foreign candidate. Yuan Guowei also said that it was "unprecedented" for a Chinese person to teach classics in Rome. Zheng completed his teaching in 1660.

==== Studies in Bologna and Coimbra, ordination (1660–1666) ====
By Jesuit formation, Zheng was to study four years of theology. From 1660 to 61, the 27-year-old Zheng studied the subject at the University of Bologna. Zheng's transfer from Rome to Bologna indicated that he "had word of a probable imminent departure for the Orient," according to Rouleau, for Bologna was closer to the transit services and would be more convenient for Zheng to leave promptly.

In September 1661, however, Zheng left for Portugal. According to Rouleau, his departure was likely because he was recruited by Giovanni Filippo de Marini, the Jesuit procurator of the Province of Japan. Zheng first reached Genoa in October, but his movement afterwards was unknown. Rouleau supposed that Zheng postponed a year of his studies in order to travel to Portugal. Zheng completed his studies in theology at the University of Coimbra in 1665. Then, along with Marini's team, he departed Europe from Lisbon in spring 1666.

A 1665 registry shows that Zheng had been ordained to priesthood and was destined to become a missionary in China. However, the exact date of his ordination is not clear. According to Rouleau, Zheng was likely ordained in 1663, in his second year of theology, and very likely had become a priest by the end of 1664. According to Dunne, Zheng was ordained in 1664. Zheng was the first Chinese Jesuit priest.

=== Travels and mission ===
On 7 April 1666, Marini and his team boarded their ship in Lisbon to prepare to travel to the east. The team consisted of one Belgian priest, six Italian priests including Claudio Filippo Grimaldi, four Portuguese priests including Thomas Pereira, a young Chinese man named Nicholas da Fonseca, and Zheng himself. They were a part of the fleet of the newly appointed Portuguese viceroy of the Indies, João Nunes da Cunha, which departed on 13 April 1666. When the fleet was near Guinea, a fever broke out, and two of the priests died. The fleet reached Goa on 13 October 1666.

==== Mission in India (1666–1668) ====
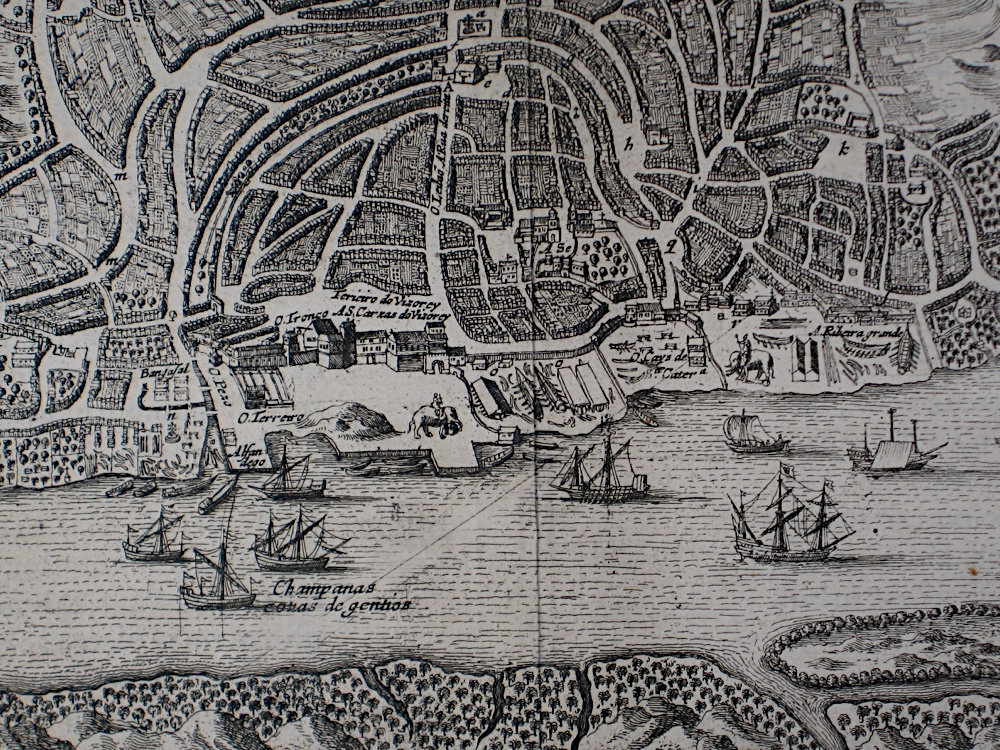
The plan of Old Goa in 1657. Zheng arrived in Goa in 1666.

In Goa, the local Jesuit superiors ordered Zheng to stay in India, contrary to his wishes to return to China. Zheng was dissatisfied with the decision: in a letter to the Society's Superior General, Giovanni Paolo Oliva, he complained that he had to learn the local language to serve in the province "for no reason".

The actual reason for Zheng's stay in India was that a 1665 Chinese imperial edict proscribed Christianity in the country, and almost all missionaries in China were left in Guangzhou. At the time, Macau was also suffering from an economic blockade (Haijin) since 1661. Zheng was thus assigned to Chaul, where there were a church and a Jesuit college.

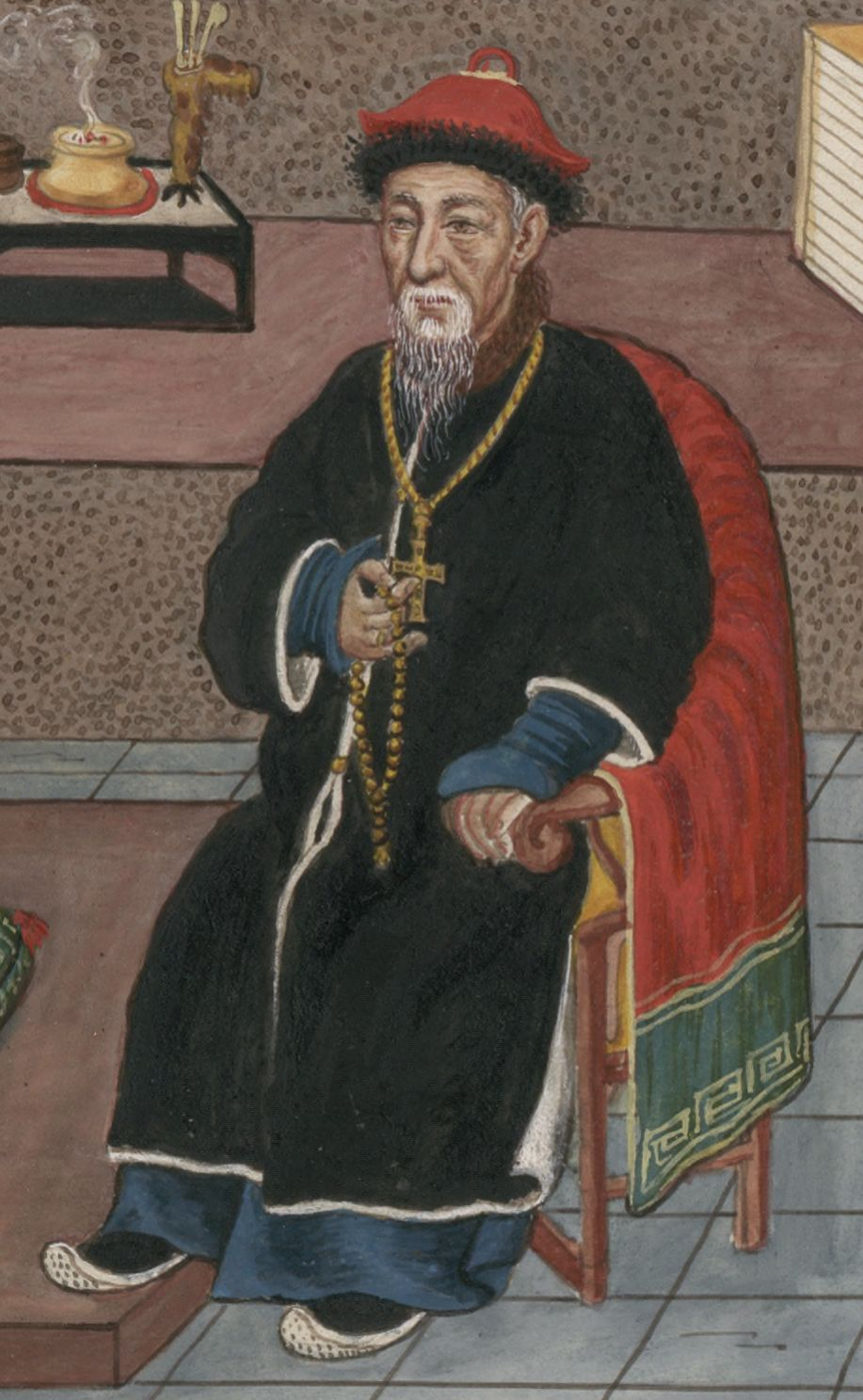
The success of Luo Wenzao working in China against the anti-Christian edict prompted Luis da Gama to send Zheng to his home country.

Around this period, Luo Wenzao, a Chinese priest, managed to evade the sanctions on foreign missionaries and travelled around China to visit the Christian congregations. The Jesuit Visitor (Note: The "Visitor" is an office in the Society of Jesus. According to L. M. Brockey, the office holder is "delegated to embody the superior general in specific Jesuit provinces, representing Rome’s authority on inspection tours of limited duration.") at Macau, Luis da Gama, was aware of Luo's achievement. He immediately summoned Zheng to Macau. In a 1668 letter to Oliva, da Gama explained his decision:

Last year [...] a Religious of St. Dominic, named Fr. Gregorio Lopez [Luo] and Chinese by race, had come over from Manila to Canton [Guangzhou] [...] From there, he visited his and our christianities with great success [...]

Since this Religious is Chinese and in his features and language is not distinguished from the [other] natives, he can easily come and go without being recognized [...] At sight of this example, I decided to direct Padre Manuel de Siqueira [Zheng] to come from Goa along with the other Padres.

— Luis da Gama (Note: Translated by Francis A. Rouleau from Portuguese original.)

==== Studies in Macau (1668–1669) ====
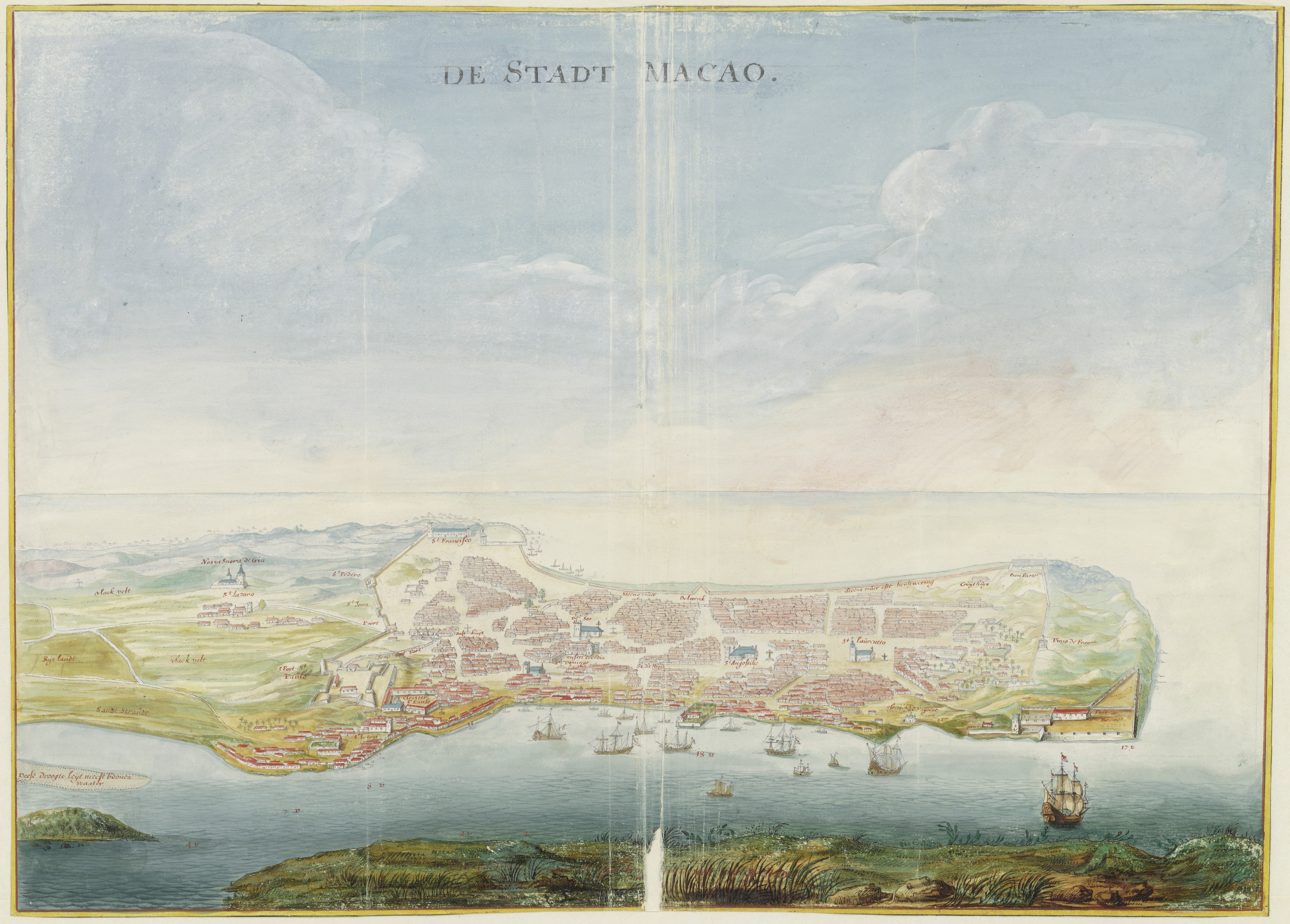
A bird's-eye view of Macau in the 1660s. Zheng returned to Macau in 1668, after spending about 23 years abroad.

Zheng left Goa with fellow Jesuits on 14 May 1668. Two months later, they reached Malacca, which was under Dutch control. They stayed at the port for nine days. According to Zheng's account, he met with many local Catholics, who were restricted by the Dutch Calvinist rule at the time. He acknowledged that the local believers had a great need of priests. Nevertheless, the priests sailed for Macau and arrived there on 19 August 1668.

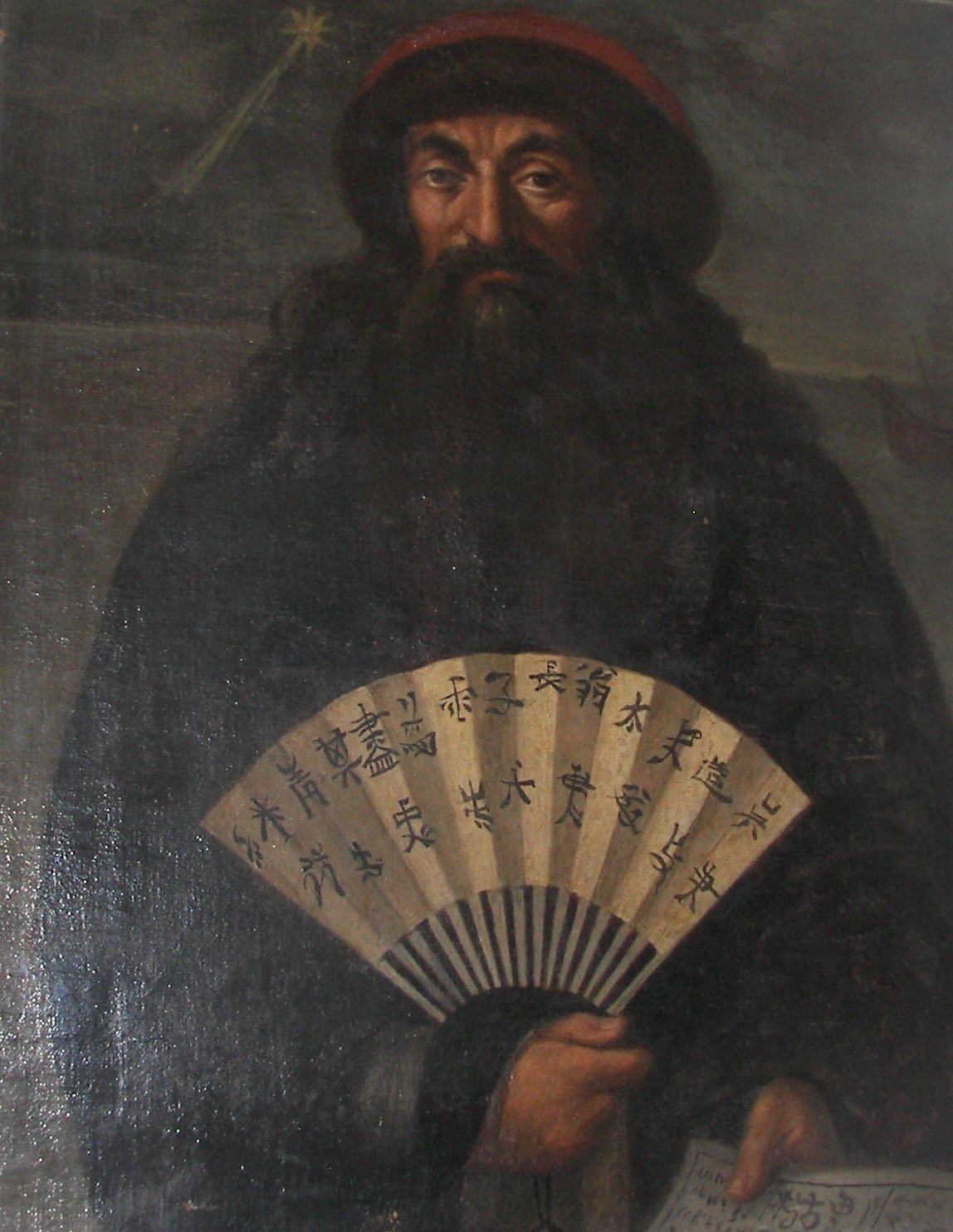
Prospero Intorcetta (1625–1696), a Jesuit priest, met Zheng in Macau in 1668-69 and influenced him.

Upon his return, Zheng first began to study the Chinese language at St. Paul's College, Macau, to prepare for his mission in China. Rouleau observed that it had been "scarcely possible" for Zheng to retain his knowledge in Chinese during his years in Europe. The Jesuit priest Prospero Intorcetta, who escaped from Guangzhou to Macau in July 1668, also briefed Zheng about the situation of Christianity in China. Fang noted that Intorcetta and Zheng communicated extensively during this period.

===== Support for native clergy in China =====
During the Chinese Rites Controversy in the 17th–18th centuries, different Catholic groups debated on the acceptance of Chinese rituals performed to honor ancestors. According to Paul Rule, the issue of Chinese clergy members is "not strictly" a part of the controversy, but "attitudes taken towards it serve as a kind of litmus-test of attitudes towards Chinese rituals and culture." Intorcetta, in particular, supported the idea of introducing members of the Chinese literati as priests. Zheng, following this idea, wrote a letter to the Superior General urging the Jesuit superiors to recruit Chinese priests. A part of the letter reads:

Dimodoche non vi resta altro mezzo per mantenere questi christiani et administrarli i sacramenti della Chiesa, si non mandare travestiti i sacerdoti naturali, che facilmente possono andare sconosciuti, il che non possono fare gli europei [...] adesso che tanto precisamente hanno bisogno di sacerdoti naturali per rimediar a questa si urgente necessita non li trovano [...] durando le cose in questa conformita, tutte queste missioni si perderanno.

So that there is no other means left for maintaining these Christians and administering the sacraments of the Church to them, other than to send native priests in disguise, who can easily go unknown, which the Europeans cannot do [...] now that they need native priests so precisely to remedy this urgent need, they cannot find them [...] if things last in this conformity, all these missions will be lost.

— Zheng Manuo

Intorcetta carried this letter, along with many reports and letters, when he departed Macau on 21 January 1669.

==== Mission in China (1669–1673) ====
After studying Chinese for one year in Macau, Zheng was sent to Guangzhou in 1669. Luis da Gama planned that Zheng would either travel around China like Luo Wenzao, or he would focus on Southern China. Zheng was assigned to the latter option. Rouleau suggested two reasons why Zheng was assigned to Southern China: the Jesuit Province of Japan and Macau wanted to prioritize its own missions, and Zheng might begin to develop tuberculosis, which would prohibit him to travel around China like Luo.

From 1669 to 1671, Zheng evangelized mainly in Guangdong, but he also travelled to Hainan and Guangxi. In 1669, he and other Jesuit priests of the Japan Province baptized 500 children in Guangzhou. In 1670, they converted 150 more people. During his time in Guangzhou, he relied on the assistance of Cai Anduo, (Note: It is not clear what the Chinese name of Cai is. Hsieh suggested "蔡安多", but Luo Ying suggested "蔡按铎".) a Christian from Macau.

In 1671, the Kangxi Emperor issued a new imperial edict that allowed the foreign missionaries to return to their provinces. On 9 March 1671, the news arrived in Guangzhou, where the foreign missionaries were detained. The emperor also ordered the governor of Guangdong to send two foreigners excelling in applied sciences to Beijing. The governor chose Claudio Filippo Grimaldi and Christian Herdtrich. Zheng was appointed to be a "Chinese gentleman secretary" (相公; xiànggōng) to the two foreign priests. Regarding Zheng's role, Hsieh Chia-wen claimed that it is "improper" to identify him merely as a gentry assistant, due to "his education and missionary work in China, as well as his status as a Jesuit priest." Rouleau suggested that Zheng was sent to Beijing not only because he could administer to the Christians there, but also because the dry, northern weather would help with his tuberculosis.

Along with other foreign missionaries, the three left from Guangzhou on 8 September 1671. However, when the waterway they were travelling on (Note: It is not clear which waterway became frozen that winter and impeded the travels of the missionaries. Rouleau put the Yangtze River. Fang put the Chinese Grand Canal.) froze over that winter, they had to abandon their vessel and walk on land. Zheng's health deteriorated throughout the journey and had to be left behind for several months. He reached Beijing alone in 1672. According to Gabriel de Magalhães, the Beijing priests met Zheng and confirmed that he had tuberculosis. A 1672 report by Adrien Grelon mentioned that he lived "incognito". Rouleau interpreted that Zheng did not present himself to the imperial court, but "remained in obscurity" and attended to the local Catholic community while affected by the disease.

== Death and legacy ==
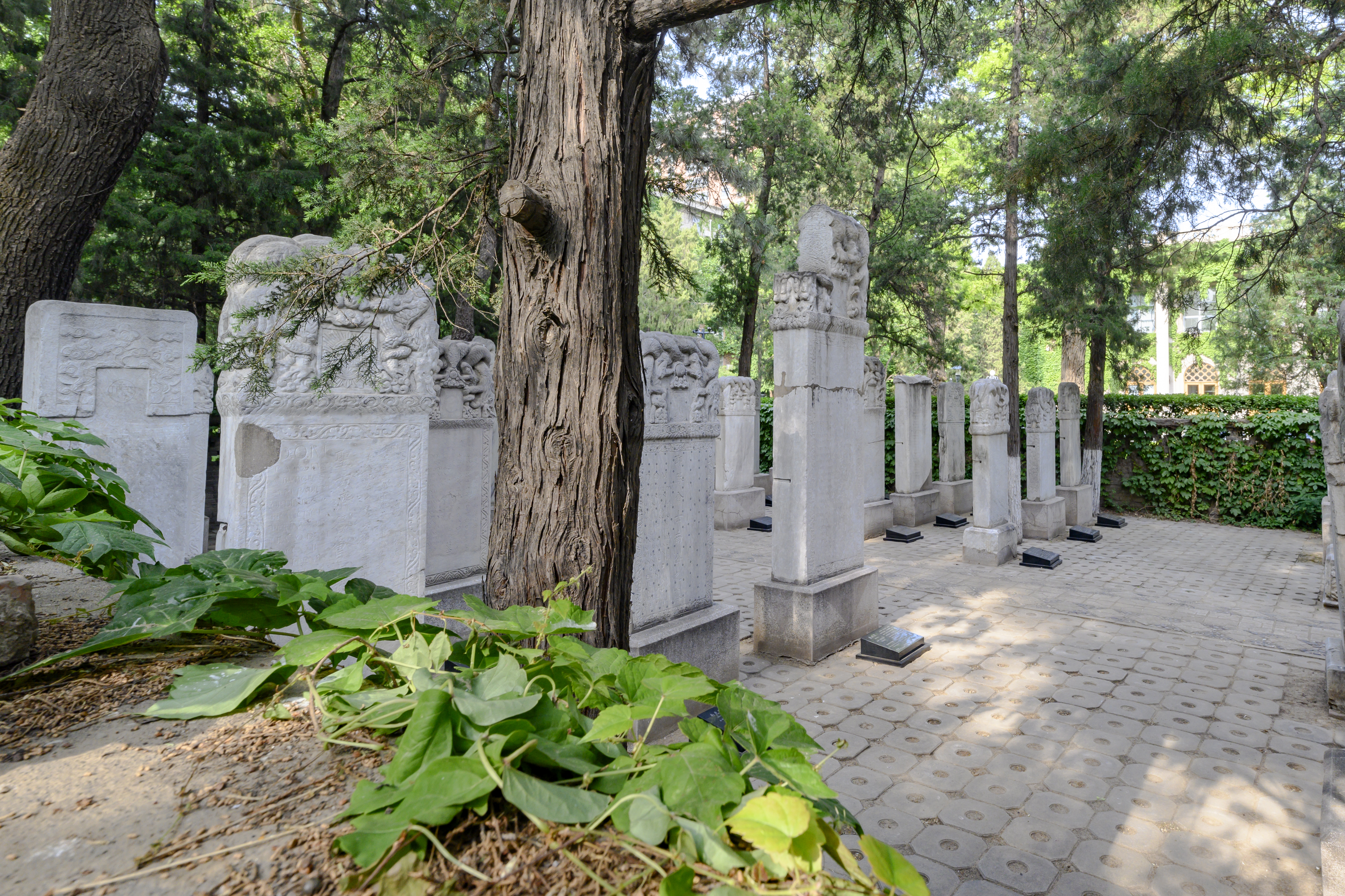
Zheng was buried at the Zhalan Cemetery in Beijing, along with other Jesuit missionaries. Zheng's tombstone was lost during the Cultural Revolution.

Zheng died of tuberculosis in Beijing on 26 May 1673, a day after his 40th birthday. He was buried outside of Fucheng Gate, in Zhalan Cemetery, a Jesuit cemetery first acquired to bury Matteo Ricci. His tomb was next to the tomb of Nicolo Longobardo. On 19 September 1673, Gabriel de Magalhães wrote to Jacques Le Faure about the Jesuit mission in Beijing. He called Zheng "a true honor, glory and prodigy of his people." In the letter, he also called for fostering Chinese priests to carry on Zheng's legacy.

A 1708 correspondence between Gian Paolo Gozani, a Visitor of the order, and Michelangelo Tamburini, the Jesuit General in Rome, mentioned that some Christians in Beijing developed a devotion of piety towards Étienne Faber and Zheng. Rouleau suggested that Zheng impressed the Beijing Christians even though he only lived for a few months in the city.

In 1958, the Catholic Patriotic Association donated Zhalan Cemetery and the attached chapel to the Beijing Municipal Party Committee School (北京市委党校). During the Cultural Revolution, the school was converted into a hostel in 1973, and Zhalan Cemetery was destroyed. It was rebuilt in 1984, but Zheng's tombstone was not recovered. Only its rubbing survived.

=== Tombstone ===
The middle of the tombstone says "Tomb of Father Zheng, Society of Jesus" (耶穌會士鄭公之墓). On the right side, there is a Chinese inscription. On the left side, there is a Latin inscription. The Chinese inscription reads:

鄭先生諱瑪諾，號惟信，中國廣東香山人也。自幼入會真修。康熙十二年癸丑四月十一日卒於京師，壽三十有八。

Father Zheng, by the name of Manuo and the courtesy name of Weixin, was a man from Xiangshan, Guangdong, China. Since he was young he entered the religious order. He died on the eleventh day of the fourth month (Note: The date is based on the Chinese calendar. Fang calculated that the eleventh day of the fourth month of the Chinese calendar that year corresponds to 26 May.) of the twelfth year under the reign of Kangxi, in the capital. He lived 38 years.

The Latin inscription reads:

P. MANVEL SEQVEIRA NATIONE SINA PATRIA MACAENSIS, ADOLESCENS ROMA PROFECTVS IBIQVE INGRESS SOC IESV PRIMVS SINARV EX EADEM SOC. SACERDOTIO DECORAT EST. PHILOSOPHIAE AC THEOLOGIAE STVDIIS CV LAVDE ABSOLVTIS PRAEDICANDI EVAGELII CAVSA REDIIT AD SVOS OBIIT PEKINI AN SAL MDCLXXIII DIE XXVI MAII. AET VERO XXXVIII.

Father Manuel Sequeira, Chinese from Macao, who went to Rome in his youth and entered the Society of Jesus there. He was the first Chinese from the Society (of Jesus), who was honored with the priesthood. Having completed his studies of philosophy and theology with distinction, he returned to his homeland in order to preach the gospel. He died in Beijing in the year of salvation 1673, on 26th of May, aged 38.

Contrary to the inscriptions, which state that Zheng lived for 38 years, most historians agree that Zheng lived for 40 years. Fang calculated that Zheng lived for 40 years and one day. Rouleau also confirmed that Zheng died 40 years old.

== See also ==
=== Early Chinese students abroad ===
- Michael Shen Fu-Tsung, 17th century Chinese student in Europe and Jesuit priest
- Arcadio Huang, Chinese scholar in Europe during the early 18th century
- Louis Fan, Chinese student in Europe during the early 18th century and Catholic priest, also buried at Zhalan Cemetery

=== Chinese Jesuits ===
- He Tianzhang, another Chinese Jesuit from Macau
- Wu Li, Chinese Jesuit and painter
- Ignatius Kung Pin-mei, 20th-century Chinese Jesuit, bishop of Shanghai

== Sources ==
=== Journal articles ===
- Brockey, L. M. (2020). Thomas M. McCoog, S.J. (ed.). "With Eyes and Ears Open: The Role of Visitors in the Society of Jesus". Journal of Jesuit Studies. 7 (2). Leiden: Brill: 323–24. doi:10.1163/22141332-00702012-01. S2CID 213209283.
- Chen, Liao (September 2014). 沈福宗、郑玛诺：17世纪去欧洲的最早留学生 [The Earliest Returned Students in the 17th Century:Shen Fuzong and Zheng Manuo]. 江苏师范大学学报（哲学社会科学版） [Journal of Jiangsu Normal University(Philosophy and Social Sciences Edition)]. 40 (5): 1–5. doi:10.16095/j.cnki.cn32-1833/c.2014.05.026. Archived from the original on 2023-05-23.
- Dunne, George H. (April 1961). "What Happened to the Chinese Liturgy?". The Catholic Historical Review. 47 (1). Catholic University of America Press: 1–14. JSTOR 25016792.
- Hsieh, Chia-wen (2021-06-14). "Forgotten Assistants behind the Scenes". Monumenta Serica. 69 (1): 49–95. doi:10.1080/02549948.2021.1910145. S2CID 235427630.
- Leeb, Leopold (June 2018). 中国的拉丁语墓碑和中西文化交流史 [Latin Tombstones in China and the History of Cultural Exchange] (PDF). 拉丁语言文化研究 [Journal of Latin Language and Culture]. 2018 (6). Hong Kong: Latinitas Sinica: 41–106. ISSN 2415-4644. Archived (PDF) from the original on 20 April 2023.
- Luo, Ying (2015-02-15). 第一位中国籍耶稣会神父澳门人郑维信生平考略 [A Study of the Life of Zheng Weixin of Macau, the First Chinese Jesuit Priest] (PDF). 世界宗教研究 [Studies in World Religions]. 2015 (1): 153–61. doi:10.3969/j.issn.1000-4289.2015.01.016. Archived from the original (PDF) on 2023-04-30.
- Rouleau, Francis A. (1 January 1959). "The First Chinese Priest of the Society of Jesus: Emmanuel de Siqueira, 1633-1673, Cheng-ma-no Wei-hsin 鄭瑪諾維信". Archivum Historicum Societatis Iesu. 28: 3–50. ProQuest 1299711614.
- Rule, Paul A. (2004). "The Chinese Rites Controversy: A Long Lasting Controversy in Sino-Western Cultural History" (PDF). Pacific Rim Report (32). Archived from the original (PDF) on 2 February 2017.
- Tan, Shulin (2002-06-05). Ni, Jinrong (ed.). 清初在华欧洲传教士与中国早期的海外留学 [The European Missionary in China and the Early Overseas Chinese Students in early Qing Dynasty] (PDF). 史学研究 [History Teaching]. 2002 (6): 25–29. Archived from the original (PDF) on 2023-08-05.
- Xiao, Lang (March 2005). 清代初期至中期的留欧学生及其教育 [The Oversea Students in Europe in the Early and the Middle Periods of the Qing Dynasty]. 西北师大学报（社会科学版） [Journal of Northwest Normal University (Social Sciences)]. 42 (2): 32–35. doi:10.16783/j.cnki.nwnus.2005.02.008. Archived from the original on 2023-05-23.

=== Books ===
- Fang, Hao (March 1988). "鄭瑪諾" [Zheng Manuo]. 中國天主教史人物傳·中 [Biographies of Figures in Chinese Catholic History (II)] (PDF) (in Chinese). Beijing: 中華書局. pp. 186–99. ISBN 7-101-00233-1.
- Huang, Hongzhao (2017). 出洋留学第一人郑玛诺 [The First to Study Abroad: Zheng Manuo]. 镜海微澜 [Wave on the Sea of Mirror: Selected Monographs on the History of Macau]. Social Sciences Literature Press. ISBN 978-7509776391.
- Leeb, Leopold (June 2017). 我的灵都：一位奥地利学者的北京随笔 (in Chinese). 新星出版社. ISBN 978-7513326087.
- Lin, Hua; et al. (March 1994). 历史遗痕：利玛窦及明清西方传教士墓地 [Footprints in History: The Tombs of Matteo Ricci and Other Western Missionaries in Ming and Ching Dynasties] (in Chinese). Renmin University of China Press. ISBN 7-300-01941-2.
- Xu, Minglong (August 2022). 旅欧中国人 [Chinese in Europe]. 欧洲十八世纪中国热 [The Chinese Vogue in Europe During the Eighteenth Century]. The Commercial Press. pp. 14–15. ISBN 978-7-100-20330-2.
- Yu, Kuangfu (2013). 起航维艰 [A Difficult Beginning] (PDF). 中国人留学史 [History of Chinese People Studying Abroad]. ISBN 9787544625876. Archived from the original (PDF) on 2023-07-09.
