= Anton Gogeisl =

German Missionary

- Born: 30 October 1701; Siegenburg
- Died: 12 October 1771 (aged 69); Beijing
- Occupation: Jesuit Missionary

Anton Gogeisl (Chinese: 鮑友管; pinyin: Bào Yǒuguǎn; 30 October 1701 – 12 October 1771) was a German Jesuit Missionary.

== Biography ==
Anton Gogeisl was born in Siegenburg, Bavaria in the Diocese of Regensburg on 30 October 1701. He was educated as a mathematician. He became a member of the Society of Jesus in 1720. In 1737 he left for China. He reached Goa on 5 August 1738 and Beijing on 1 March 1739.

In 1746 Gogeisl was made vice-president of the Tribunal of Mathematicians and a mandarin (6th class). Gogeisl followed Ignaz Kögler (1680–1746) and Augustin von Hallerstein (1703–74) as Assistant Director at the Peking Observatory, and remained in this position for 26 years, He probably designed one of the quadrants in the observatory. In 1766 he met with the Korean Hong Daeyong (1722–1809) to discuss astronomy and religion.

He died on 12 October 1771 in Beijing. He was buried in the Jesuits' Zhalan Cemetery in Beijing.
