= Johann Schreck =

German Jesuit missionary in China (1576-1630)

Johann Schreck SJ
- Born: 1576; Bingen, Baden-Württemberg or Constance
- Died: 11 May 1630 (aged 53–54); Beijing, Ming dynasty
- Resting place: Zhalan Cemetery, Beijing
- Occupation: Jesuit missionary

Johann(es) Schreck, also Terrenz or Terrentius Constantiensis, Deng Yuhan Hanpo (鄧玉函), Deng Zhen Lohan (1576, Bingen, Baden-Württemberg or Constance – 11 May 1630, Beijing) was a German Jesuit, missionary to China and polymath. He is credited with the development of scientific-technical terminology in Chinese.

== Early life ==
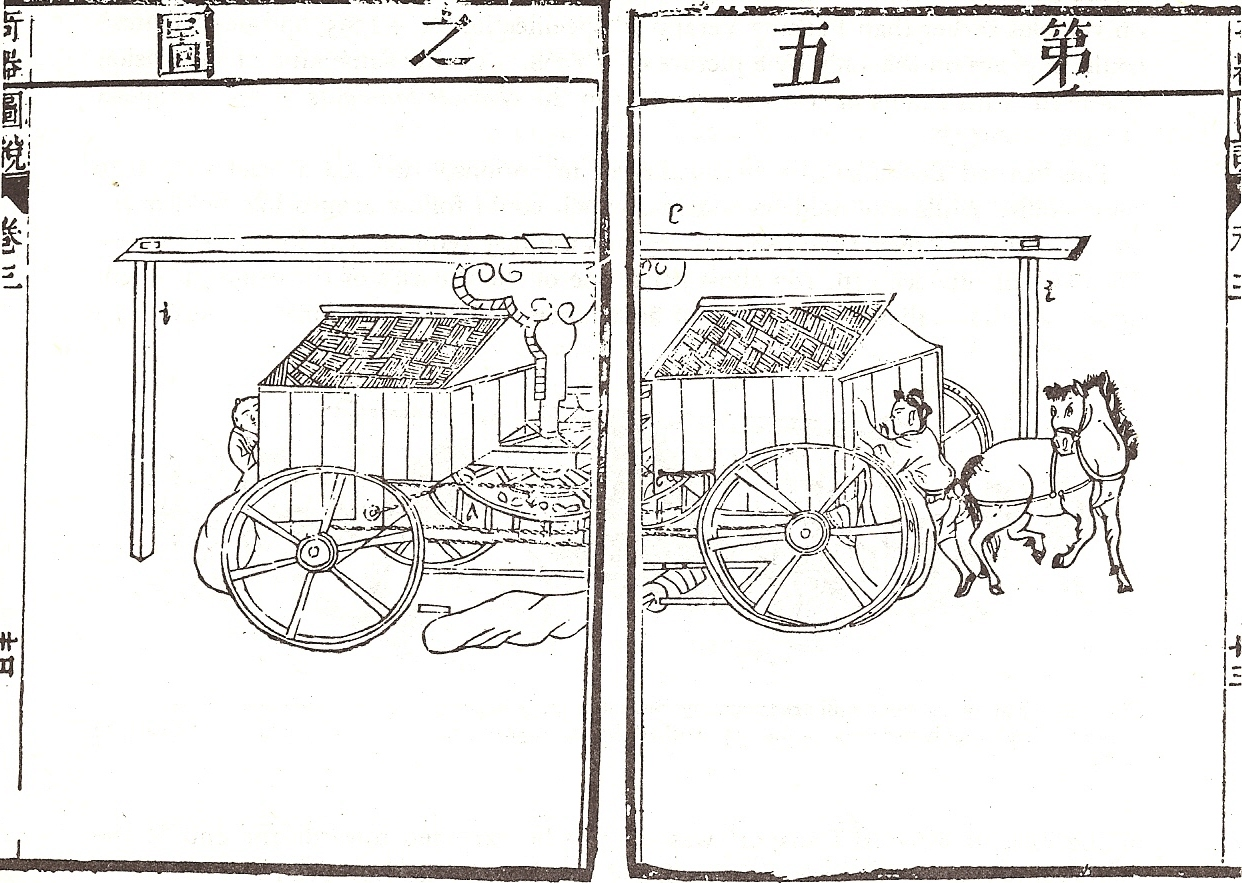
The field mill in the Chinese book Yuanxi Qiqi Tushuo Luzui (Collected Diagrams and Explanations of the Wonderful Machines of the Far West), compiled and translated by Johann Schreck and his Chinese colleague Wang Zheng in 1627

Schreck studied medicine starting in 1590 at the Albert Ludwigs University of Freiburg, the University of Altdorf. After graduating, he is also known to have worked as an assistant to the mathematician François Viète in Paris in around 1600. After Viète's death in 1603, he moved to the University of Padua, where he was a student of Galileo Galilei, but studied medicine.

Schreck had an exceptional facility with languages; he spoke German, Italian, Portuguese, French and English. Like most educated men of his time, he wrote his letters in Latin. He also mastered Ancient Greek, Hebrew and Biblical Aramaic. Later in his life, he learned Chinese.

== Sojourn in Rome ==
Schreck became a highly respected medic and was affiliated to the Accademia dei Lincei in Rome, which he joined on 3 May 1611, a few days after Galileo Galilei. Together with two other German-speaking members of the Accademia, Giovanni Faber and Theophilus Müller, he worked on the encyclopaedia of botany Rerum medicarum Novae Hispaniae Thesaurus which had been begun decades before by Francisco Hernández de Toledo and purchased, incomplete, by Federico Cesi. This work did not occupy him for long however, as he decided to join the Jesuit order, taking his vows on 1 November 1611. Galileo described his decision as "Una gran perdita" – "a big loss".

== Passage to China ==
The founder of the Jesuit mission in China, Matteo Ricci, had sent his colleague Nicolas Trigault back to Europe to search out new missionaries who could share the most advanced scientific ideas with the Chinese. Trigault met Schreck in Rome in 1614, while Schreck was studying theology, and persuaded him to go to China. To raise money and equipment for their mission, they travelled around Europe in 1616, soliciting donations and collecting books, mechanical equipment and scientific instruments. One of their donors was Cardinal Federico Borromeo of Milan, who gave them what was to be the first western telescope in China.

In April 1618, Schreck sailed from Lisbon with a group of Jesuits Trigault had assembled, including Giacomo Rho and Johann Adam Schall von Bell. After several pirate attacks and outbreaks of disease Schreck arrived at Goa in October 1618. He continued on his way, collecting samples of flora and fauna wherever he stopped en route; Giulio Aleni later claimed that alone he had discovered more than five hundred new plants. His plan was to produce a compendium with the title Plinius Indicus (The Indian Pliny), similar to Hernandez's volume on Mexico. He worked on this project throughout his stay in China, and expanded it to include descriptions of more than 8,000 varieties of plant, but his early death meant it was never finished. His manuscripts were preserved, perhaps into the eighteenth century, in the collections of the Portuguese College in Beijing, but are now lost.

== Early work in China ==
Schreck reached Macau on 22 July 1619 during a period towards the end of the reign of the Ming Emperor Wanli, when Jesuits had been expelled from Beijing and Nanjing. He, therefore, spent nearly two years in Macau learning Chinese before continuing to Hangzhou in June 1621. There, probably in collaboration with a Christian convert named Li Zhizao, he wrote Taixi renshen shuogai (An Outline of Western Theories of the Human Body), based on Theatrum anatomicum by Caspar Bauhin. This work described the human body, the senses and language, including an outline of Matteo Ricci's famous memory palace. The book was edited by another convert, Bi Gongchen, and published after Schreck's death.

After reaching Beijing in late 1623 Schreck began collaborating closely with a judge and military inspector from Shaanxi named Wang Zheng. In 1627 the two of them published the Diagrams and Explanations of the Wonderful Machines of the Far West.

== Astronomy ==
Matteo Ricci had asked Trigault to bring back missionaries with a knowledge of astronomy and, as Schreck was the ablest of the new recruits, much of the work translating and explaining astronomical works fell to him. For help in this task, Schreck wrote for advice to Johannes Kepler who replied in 1627, explaining how predictions could be improved by using an elliptical model for the Moon's orbit, and enclosing a copy of his new Rudolphine Tables. In advance of the solar eclipse of 21 June 1629 over Beijing, Schreck and Nicolò Longobardo competed with Chinese astronomers to predict the timing with the greatest accuracy. The Jesuits' calculations were more accurate, and on this basis, the Emperor Chongzhen asked them to undertake a revision of the Chinese calendar.

Schreck also produced plans for building astronomical instruments, which were approved by the Emperor. However he died shortly afterwards, and the project was completed by Johann Adam Schall von Bell and Giacomo Rho. Schall also published a manuscript by Schreck containing much of his knowledge of astronomy and related mathematics, called Ce tian yue shuo (測天約說; Brief Description of the Measurement of the Heavens). This describes the basics of astronomy, the movements of heavenly bodies, the working of the telescope, and sunspots, although the existence of these had been known in China for some time. Schall likewise revised and published two works by Schreck on trigonometry, Da ce (大測; The Great Measurement) and Ge-yuan ba-xian biao (割圓八線表; A Table of Eight Lines), the latter together with Rho.

== Death ==
Schreck is said to have died as a result of a medical experiment on himself. He is buried in the Zhalan Cemetery in Beijing.

== See also ==
- Jesuit China missions
