= He Tianzhang =

Chinese Jesuit priest (1667–1636)

He Tianzhang SJ
- Francisco Xavier do Rosário
- Born: 1667; Portuguese Macau
- Died: 11 May 1736 (aged 68–69); Beijing, Qing Empire
- Resting place: Zhalan Cemetery, Beijing
- Occupation: Jesuit missionary

Chinese name
- Chinese: 何天章
Transcriptions
Standard Mandarin
- Hanyu Pinyin: Hé Tiānzhāng
- Wade–Giles: Ho2 T'ien1-chang1
- IPA: [xɤ̌ tʰjɛ́n.ʈʂáŋ]
Yue: Cantonese
- Jyutping: Ho^{4} Tin^{1}-zoeng^{1}

He Tianzhang SJ (Chinese: 何天章, 1667 – 11 May 1736), also known as Francisco Xavier do Rosário, (Note: In some sources, Francisco Xavier a Rosario.) was a Jesuit missionary in Qing China. He mostly worked in Shanxi, where he contended against the restrictions on Chinese Rites. Banished to Guangzhou in 1724, he returned to Shanxi in 1727, was suspended from his activities in 1732 for his tolerance over the Chinese Rites, and died in 1736 in Beijing.

== Life ==
He Tianzhang was born in 1667 in Macau. His courtesy name was "Qiwen" (起文). He was a second-generation Catholic, and he studied at the primary school in Macau. He joined the Society of Jesus on 28 September 1686 and underwent several years of Jesuit formation. In January 1691, he and other Jesuits accompanied Francisco Nogueira, a Jesuit provincial visitor, to Guangzhou. There, Bishop Bernardino della Chiesa waived the standard age requirement for the priesthood for He Tianzhang, and subsequently ordained him in March of that year. At the time of his ordination, he was the youngest of the six Chinese Jesuits in China.

After his ordination, he celebrated his first Mass in Nanjing, and remained there for a few months assisting another Jesuit missionary Antonio Posateri. Later in 1691, he went to Jiangzhou, Shanxi, to work with other Jesuits. On 1 November 1700 he made the Jesuit final vows. The Jesuit vice-provincial of China, Antoine Thomas, recorded that He was pious, religious, and acted with prudence. After his fellow Jesuits had either died or taken other positions, He became the only missionary in the province of Shanxi by 1716.

In 1715, Pope Clement XI wrote the apostolic constitution Ex illa die to settle the Chinese Rites controversy, which restricted Chinese Catholics in participating ceremonies honoring Confucius and one's ancestors. By 15 February 1717, He Tianzhang had taken an oath to uphold the constitution. However, he also sent eight questions in Latin to Antonio Laghi da Castrocaro, apostolic vicar in Shaanxi and Shanxi. According to Witek, He Tianzhang argued that the constitution "could not be put into practice", and that he did not find fault with students revering the tablet of Confucius. Laghi replied to He that he sent his doubts to Rome, and he shared He's fear in receiving censures for not carrying out the constitution.

At the same time in 1717, the Kangxi Emperor approved a memorial from the Qing Ministry of War to restrict missionaries to practice Catholicism only at the Beijing court. De Yin (德音), the governor of Shanxi at the time, soon wrote to the Ministry of Rites for directions in dealing with He Tianzhang. He Tianzhang was subsequently interrogated. Having failed to negotiate with local officials, he left Shanxi and fled to Beijing, where he stayed from February to May 1718. Later in 1718, the Kangxi emperor issued an edict and postponed the prohibition against Christianity. The governor of Shanxi allowed He Tianzhang to return to Taiyuan, but did not grant him entry to Jiangzhou. In 1719, He failed to prevent the confiscation of the church at Jiangzhou.

On 11 February 1724, the Yongzheng emperor issued an edict against Christianity. The missionaries in China were sent to Guangzhou and Macau. By March 1725, He Tianzhang was exiled to Guangzhou. However, because of his Chinese appearance, he was able to leave the city and return to Shanxi. In 1727 He became a missionary in Shanxi again. He learned about the Catholic Manchu nobles of the Sunu family, who were exiled in Youwei, Shanxi, for their conversion. He was only able to meet their servants, but received thanks from the nobility.

In late 1727, He traveled to Henan. On the way, He contested to Francisco Garretto, a Franciscan visiting the Catholic missions in China, about Garretto's strict approach on the Chinese Rites. Garretto forwarded He's letter to the Propaganda Fide. In 1732 He returned to Jiangzhou, Shanxi, and worked under the Franciscan vicar apostolic, Francesco Saraceni, who prohibited several Chinese customs for the Catholics, including using spiritual tablets for the dead. In June 1732 Garreto, who became the coadjutor bishop in Shaanxi and Shanxi, also instructed He to follow the 1714 constitution and forbid ancestral tablets. However, He did not enforce the instructions. Witek analysed that He "knew very well" that local Christians were unable to follow the Catholic commands, and that the Chinese Rites were "indispensable" to them. Thus, Garretto suspended He Tianzhang from his missionary duties and all contacts with local Christians on 3 August 1732. He stayed in Shanxi in the next three months before leaving for Beijing and then Huguang.

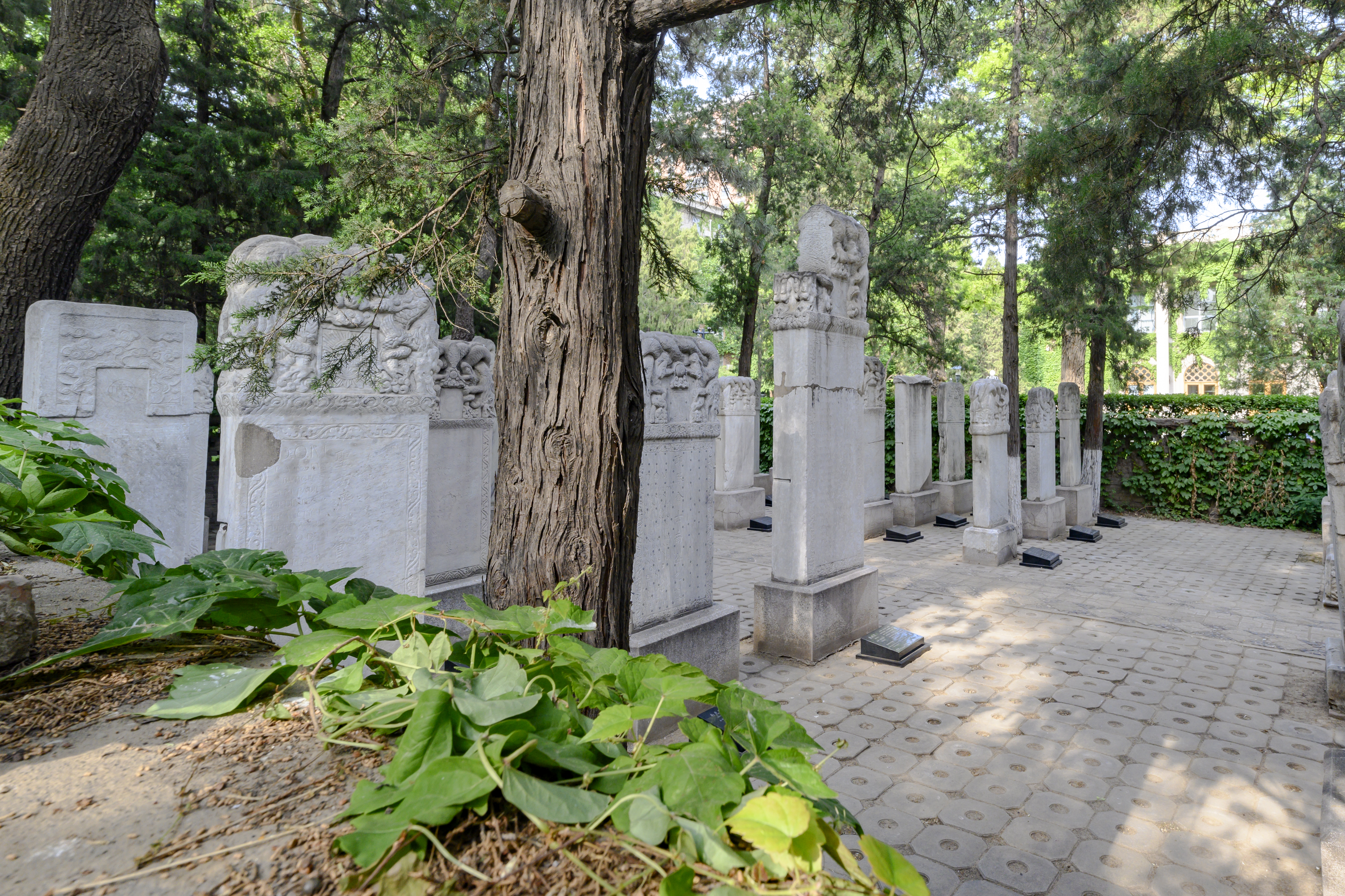
He Tianzhang was buried at the Zhalan Cemetery in Beijing, along with other Jesuit missionaries.

Around this time, Garretto went to Beijing and discussed He's suspension with Domingo Pinheiro, the Jesuit vice-provincial of China. By the summer of 1733, He made a retraction of his views, which was sent to the Catholic community in Jiangzhou. It was not clear whether he continued his mission in Shanxi. On 11 May 1736 he died in Beijing. He was buried at Zhalan Cemetery.

=== Racial and national identity ===
In the 20th century, scholars including Louis Pfister and Fang Hao believed that He Tianzhang had a European father and a Chinese mother. John W. Witek in 2009 noted that both of He's parents were Chinese according to a Jesuit catalogue. Isabel M. Pina also categorised He as "Chinese" in her 2013 paper on Chinese and mixed-parentage Jesuits.

Regarding his race and nationality, in a 1716 letter, He Tianzhang lamented about his "sad Chinese appearance" and affirmed that he was a subject of the King of Portugal. When the Qing government, intending to banish foreign missionaries, interrogated He in 1717, he again argued that he had always been a subject of the king of Portugal, and by which he had acquired a permit to stay in China. The officials eventually recorded that He was a "citizen of Macau" (澳門人). Witek observed that, by using the phrase "citizen of Macau", the officials recognised He was Chinese and "did not fall within the ambit" of the imperial prohibition against foreign missionaries.

== See also ==
- Francis Xavier (1506–1552), Jesuit missionary, patron saint of Macau, and He Tianzhang's namesake
- Matteo Ricci (1552–1610), Jesuit missionary, founding figure of the Jesuit missions in China, also buried at Zhalan Cemetery
- Luo Wenzao (c. 1610s–1691), Dominican missionary, first Chinese Catholic Bishop
- Zheng Manuo (1633–1673), first Chinese Jesuit priest and first Chinese student in Europe, also a second-generation Catholic from Macau, and also buried at Zhalan Cemetery
