= Ignaz Kögler =

German missionary

Ignaz Kögler (called Lai in Chinese; 11 May 1680 – 30 March 1746) was a German Jesuit missionary in Qing China.

== Life ==
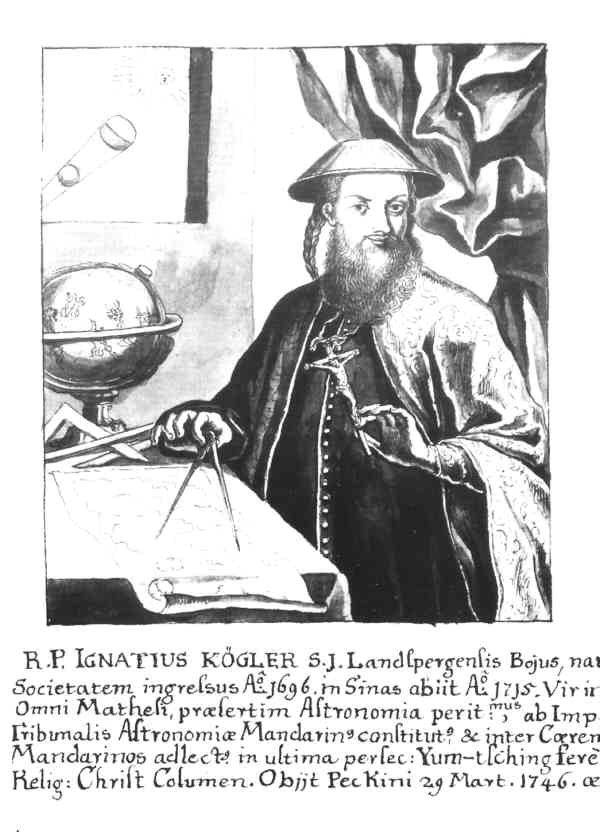
Ignaz Kögler was an astronomer and mandarin

Kögler was born at Landsberg am Lech in Bavaria. Along with Johann Adam Schall von Bell he was a leading figure among the fifty German Jesuits who between 1650 and 1750 worked in the Chinese missions. He entered the Society of Jesus on 4 October 1696, and taught mathematics and Hebrew from 1712 to 1714 in the University of Ingolstadt.

He left Prague for Portugal in 1715, being joined by the noted Czech sinologist Karel Slavíček. In Lisbon a Portuguese Jesuit joined them. On 13 March 1716 they left for China. It took them 170 days to get there, surviving a major storm, during which many of their belongings were damaged.

On account of his wide learning, he enjoyed consideration at the imperial court, and held the office of president of the mathematical astronomical tribunal for thirty years. He was a mandarin of the second class, and was from 1731 a member of the supreme court of equity (Li-pu), a position which had never before been held by a foreigner. In accepting these positions he refused the stipends attached to them.

Ferdinand Augustin Hallerstein, his co-operator and successor, called him "one of the most cultivated minds that ever came into these countries". Kögler carried on a brisk scientific correspondence with a number of European scholars, such as Eusebius Amort and T. S. Bayer, the Orientalist, sending Bayer many contributions for his "Museum Sinicum".

He was twice visitor of the mission, and provincial of the Chinese and Japanese province, and, during the persecution which began under the Yongzheng Emperor, he was the main support of the mission, through his influence at court. He died, aged 65, at Beijing. He was buried in the Jesuits' Zhalan Cemetery.

Asteroid 5005 Kegler is named after him.
