= Geshu bu =

The Geshu bu (格術補), translated to English as the Supplement to Geometric Optics, Science Updates, or Optic Updates, is a book on optics written by the Chinese Guangdong gentry and intellectual Zou Boqi (1819–1869). The book was written in the late Qing Dynasty period in China. It covers the principles of lenses and is based on mathematical theory.

== Background ==
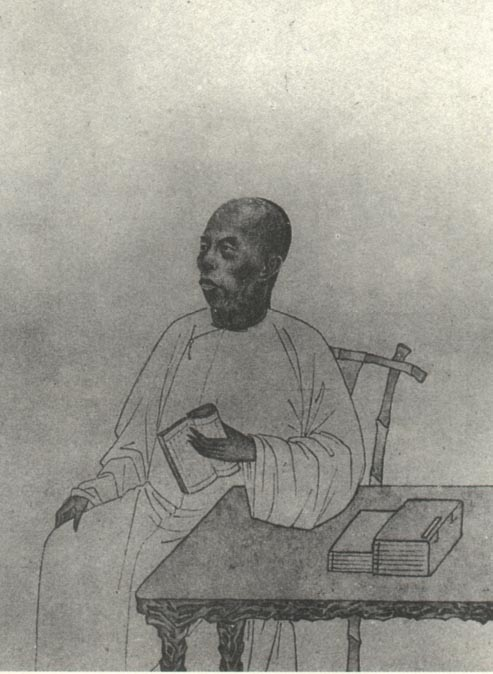
Zou Boqi, author of the Geshu bu

Zou Boqi wrote two significant works in optics: the Geshu bu and the "Notes on the Mechanism for Capturing Images" (Sheying zhi qi ji). The Geshu bu tackles the Chinese principles on optics and its related literature while the Sheyi zhi qi ji delves more on the results of Zou's experiments as well as principles on photography. The Geshu bu was published in 1874, after Zou Boqi's death. In the late nineteenth century, Western knowledge, especially in optics, began to influence China. Zou's book, Geshu bu, introduced basic concepts of optics and lens, building on earlier Jesuit translations. This work challenged the traditional Mohist views and laid the groundwork for geometrical optics in China.

== Contents ==
Based from one fascicle of the book, published in 1877, it aims to expand on ancient Chinese mathematics. The term geshu highlights thorough investigation as explained in the preface by the Chinese philosopher Chen Li, drawing from Western lens-making techniques.

In the book, Zou discussed different mirror shapes and principles. He also explained convex lenses, focusing on how they concentrate sunlight to ignite a fire. The focal point determines how close or far an image appears.

The text introduces trigonometric calculations for lens reflections, providing a mathematical basis for understanding convex mirrors as well as adding details on telescopes and microscopes. The book also corrected some mistakes made by J. Adam Schall von Bell and Zhen Fuguang, writers on optics in China.

=== Reception ===
Due to its unique approach of integrating mathematical calculations in lens-making principles, the book received high praise from Qing scholars. In 1886, Zhu Kebao wrote about optical methods in his biography of Zou Boqi. Zou's book helped circulated the knowledge of optics and lenses in the print market. Such circulation was reflected in a winning essay from the 1889 Polytechnic Institute (Gezhi shuyuan, 格致書院) contest, linking optics and the "mirror that lights a fire."
