= Zhalan Cemetery =

Jesuit cemetery in Beijing, China

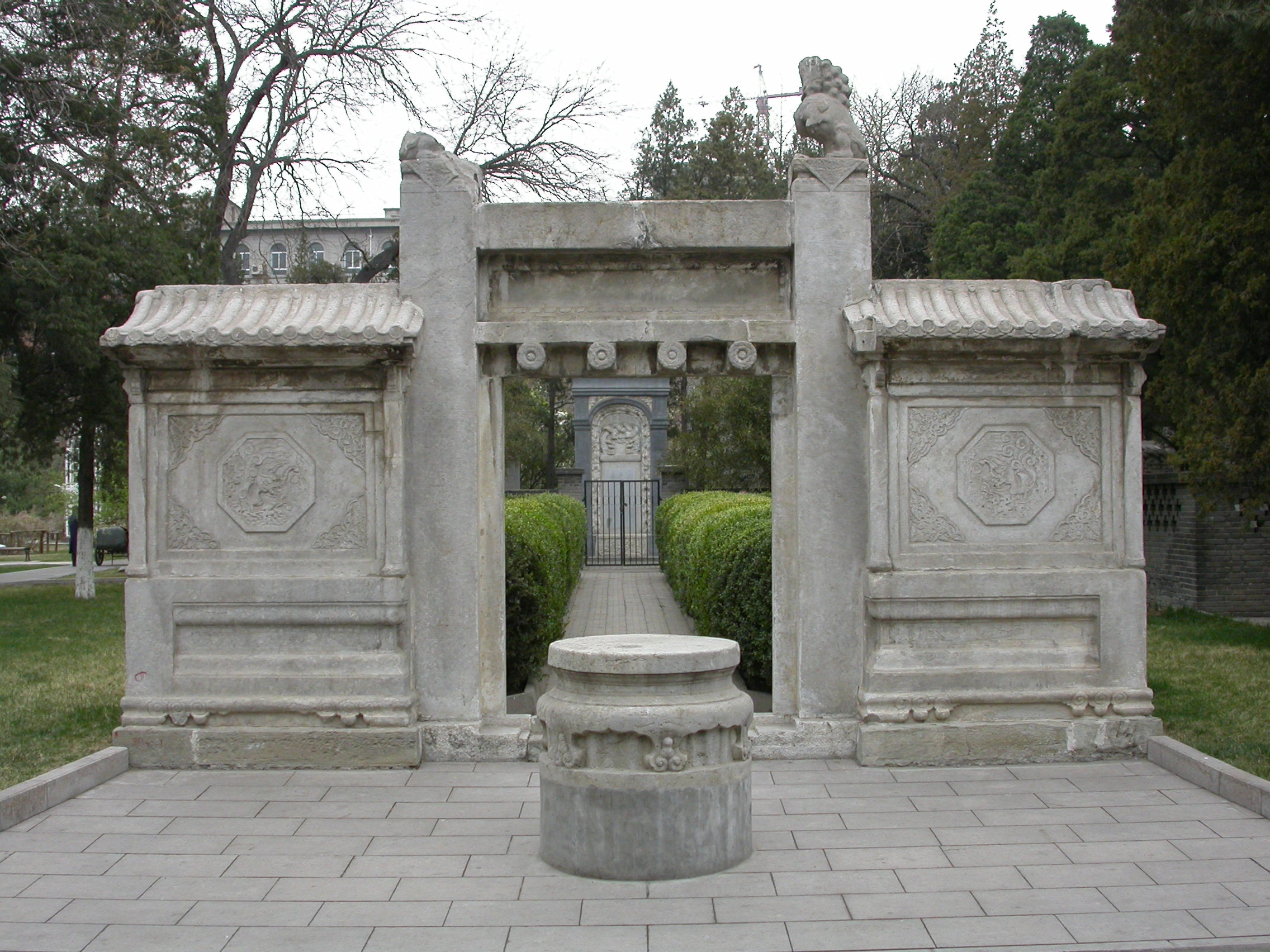
Portal of Zhalan Cemetery with the tombstone of Matteo Ricci in the background

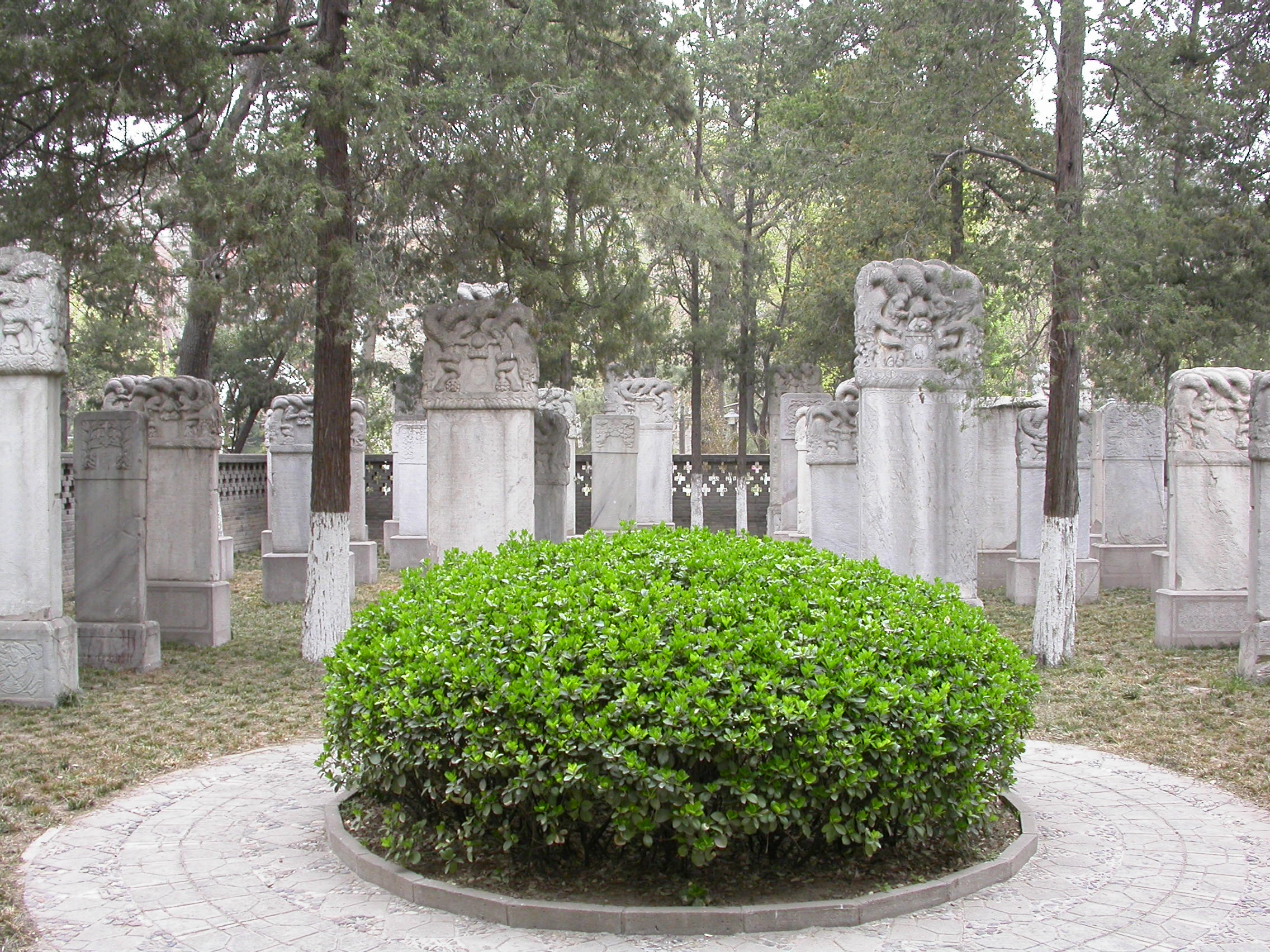
Jesuit tombstones re-erected at Zhalan Cemetery

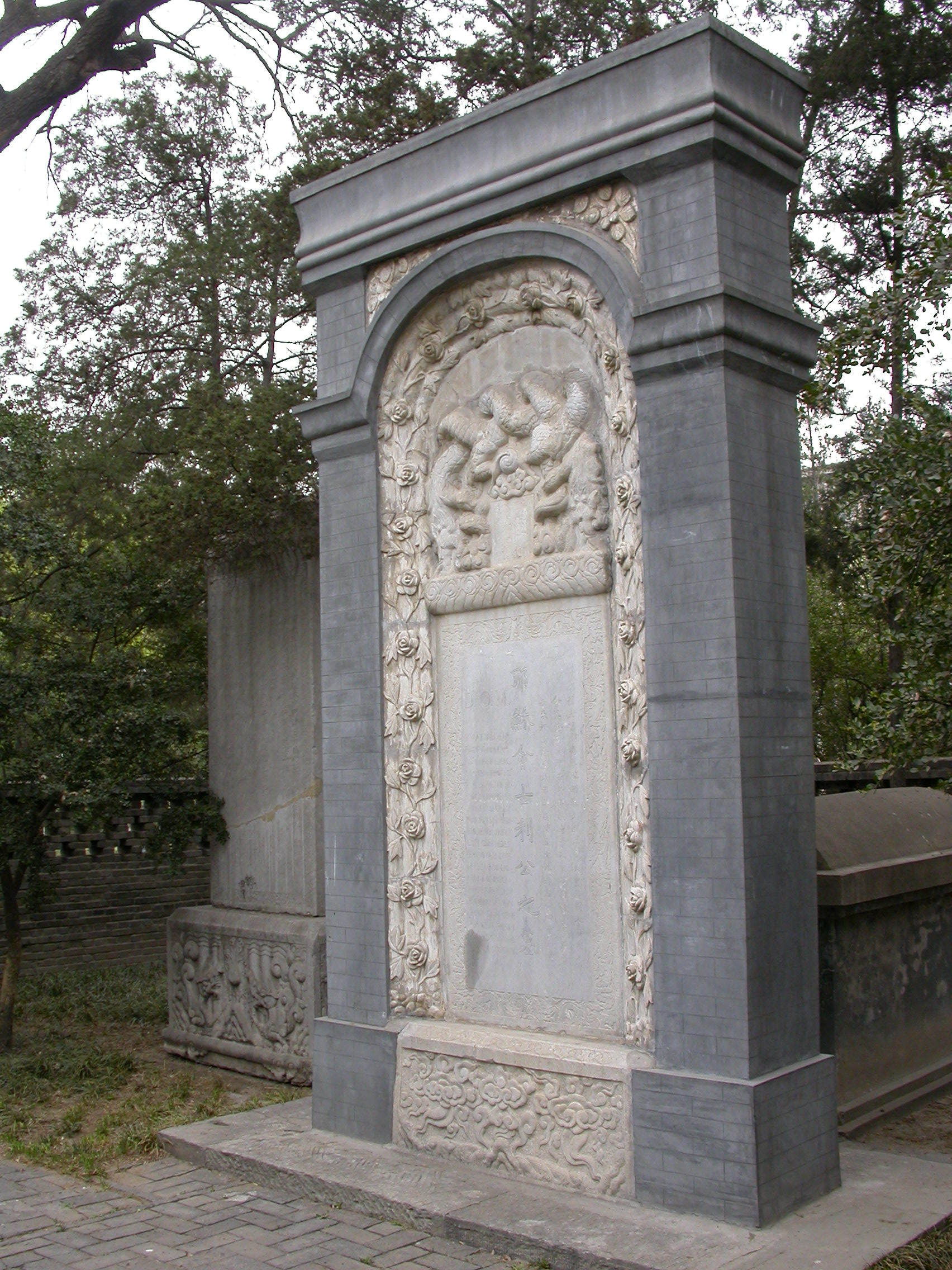
Tombstone of Matteo Ricci, early 17th century, with surrounding brickwork as added in the early 20th century

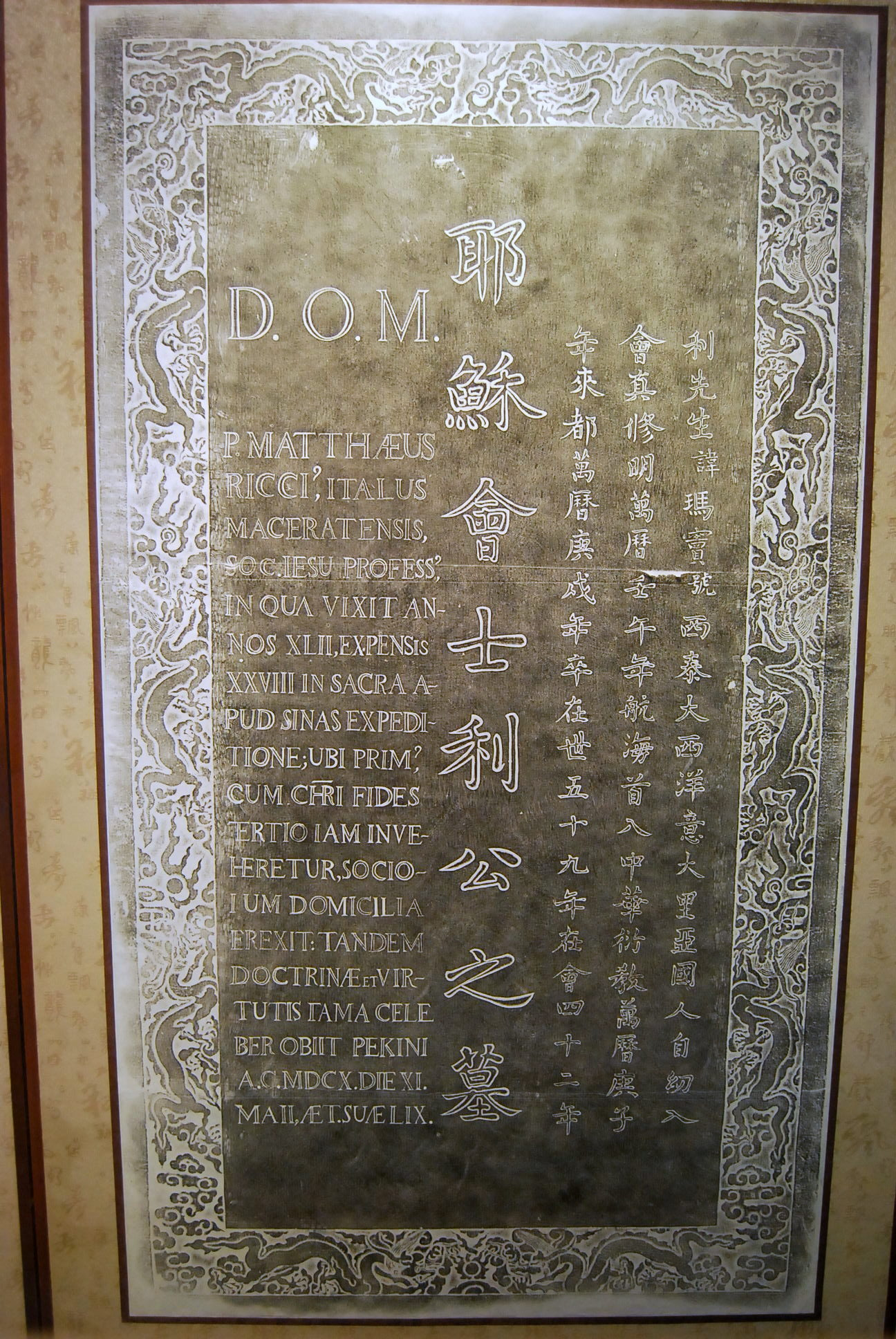
Rubbing of Ricci's bilingual epitaph in Latin (left) and Chinese (right)

Zhalan Cemetery (Chinese: 滕公栅栏; pinyin: ténggōng zhàlan) is a former Jesuit burial ground in Beijing. It is the oldest Christian cemetery in China.

It was initially established in the late Ming dynasty for the burial of missionary Matteo Ricci. There are 88 Jesuit graves in the cemetery.

The current setup is a restoration using original carved tombstones, following multiple episodes of desecration and turmoil during the Boxer Rebellion, the 1950s and the Cultural Revolution.

== History ==
Ricci had wished to be buried in Beijing, as a rare honour for a non-Chinese foreigner and a recognition of the status of the Catholic Church in the Empire. Following his death on 11 May 1610, the Wanli Emperor allowed Diego de Pantoja to create a burial ground. The imperial decision was implemented on a lot that had been recently confiscated from a disgraced eunuch, outside the Fuchengmen gate of the Beijing city fortifications. A funeral ceremony was held on 22 April 1611, with a procession starting from the Jesuit premises where the Cathedral of the Immaculate Conception now stands. Ricci's coffin stayed at the cemetery's chapel for several months until it was finally buried in November 1611.

Other Jesuits were buried on the ground in the ensuing years. In 1654, Johann Adam Schall von Bell obtained from the Shunzhi Emperor the authorization to extend the cemetery. Schall von Bell was himself buried there in 1666.

Following the Suppression of the Society of Jesus by the Holy See in 1773, the Lazarists took care of the cemetery, then the archimandrite of the Chinese Orthodox Church, then again the Catholic Church.

The cemetery was vandalized in 1900 during the Boxer Rebellion, and the bones of the interred Jesuits were dispersed. Its restoration, stipulated by the Boxer Protocol, included the brick framing of some of the delicately carved tombstones. At the same time a church dedicated to Mary was erected nearby (Maweigou Church).

In the mid-1950s, remains including hundreds of tombstones were moved to the Xibeiwang area of Beijing (now the Catholic Cemetery, zh:北京天主教陵園). A Chinese Communist Party school, now the Beijing Administration Institute, was established on the grounds. Because of their historical significance, however, the tombstones of Ricci, Johann Adam Schall von Bell and Ferdinand Verbiest were kept on the original ground. Other monumental tombstones were aligned against the Maweigou Church's wall.

During the Cultural Revolution, the site was again targeted as a symbol of foreign domination. The Red Guards intended to destroy the tombstones, but a staff member of the party school persuaded them to bury them instead, which ensured their preservation. The Maweigou Church was demolished in 1974.

In the late 1970s, Deng Xiaoping approved the restoration of Matteo Ricci's grave. The tombstones of Ricci, Schall von Bell and Verbiest were once again re-erected on what was believed to be their original locations. 60 additional original tombstones were re-erected in 1984 in a fenced section, of which 14 of were Chinese converts and 46 of European missionaries.

Jean-Luc Dehaene, Valéry Giscard d'Estaing, Sergio Mattarella, Giorgio Napolitano, Jorge Sampaio, Oscar Luigi Scalfaro and Miloš Zeman are among the foreign dignitaries who have visited the cemetery with their Chinese official hosts since.

== Tombstones ==
The tombstones uniquely combine Western and Chinese features. Each of them is topped by a dragon framing the christogram of the Society of Jesus, and includes a text in Latin (to the left) and Chinese (to the right). The epitaph of Matteo Ricci, for example, includes a summary of biographical information.

== Notable burials at Zhalan ==
Among the prominent early modern missionaries and scholars who were buried there are, listed in chronological order of burial:

- Matteo Ricci (1552–1610)
- Johann Schreck (or Terrenz) (1576–1630)
- Giacomo Rho (1593–1638)
- Nicolò Longobardo (1559–1654)
- Johann Adam Schall von Bell (1591–1666)
- Gabriel de Magalhães (1610–1677)
- Lodovico Buglio (1606–1682)
- Ferdinand Verbiest (1623–1688)
- Pierre Frapperie (1664–1704)
- Thomas Pereira (1645–1708)
- Antoine Thomas (1644–1709)
- Caspar Castner (1655–1709)
- Kilian Stumpf (1655–1720)
- He Tianzhang (1667–1736)
- Franz Ludwig Stadlin (1658–1740)
- Xavier Ehrenbert Fridelli (1673–1743)
- Ignaz Kögler (1680–1746)
- Teodorico Pedrini (1671–1746)
- Louis Fan born Fan Shouyi (1682–1753)
- Giuseppe Castiglione (1688–1766)
- Florian Bahr (1706–1771)
- Anton Gogeisl (1701–1771)
- Ferdinand Augustin Hallerstein (1703–1774)
- Ignatius Sichelbart (1708–1780)

Most of the above-listed Jesuits' original tombstones are still at Zhalan, though not those of Longobardo, Buglio, Pereira and Pedrini.

== Zhengfu Temple Jesuit Cemetery ==
In the 18th century, a separate cemetery was established by French Jesuits in the Haidian District of Beijing. That cemetery no longer exists, but some of its remaining tombstones are exhibited in the open-air Beijing Art Museum of Stone Carvings (Chinese: 北京石刻艺术博物馆; pinyin: Běijīng Shíkè Yìshù Bówùguǎn) at the Zhenjue Temple, including those of Jean-François Gerbillon (1654–1707), Joachim Bouvet (1656–1730), Dominique Parrenin (1665–1741), François Xavier d'Entrecolles (1664–1741), Pierre Nicolas d'Incarville (1706–1757), Michel Benoist (1715–1774) and Pierre-Martial Cibot (1727–1780).

== See also ==
- List of Jesuit sites

== Notes ==
39°55′44″N 116°20′41″E
