= Beijing Administration Institute =

School in People's Republic of China

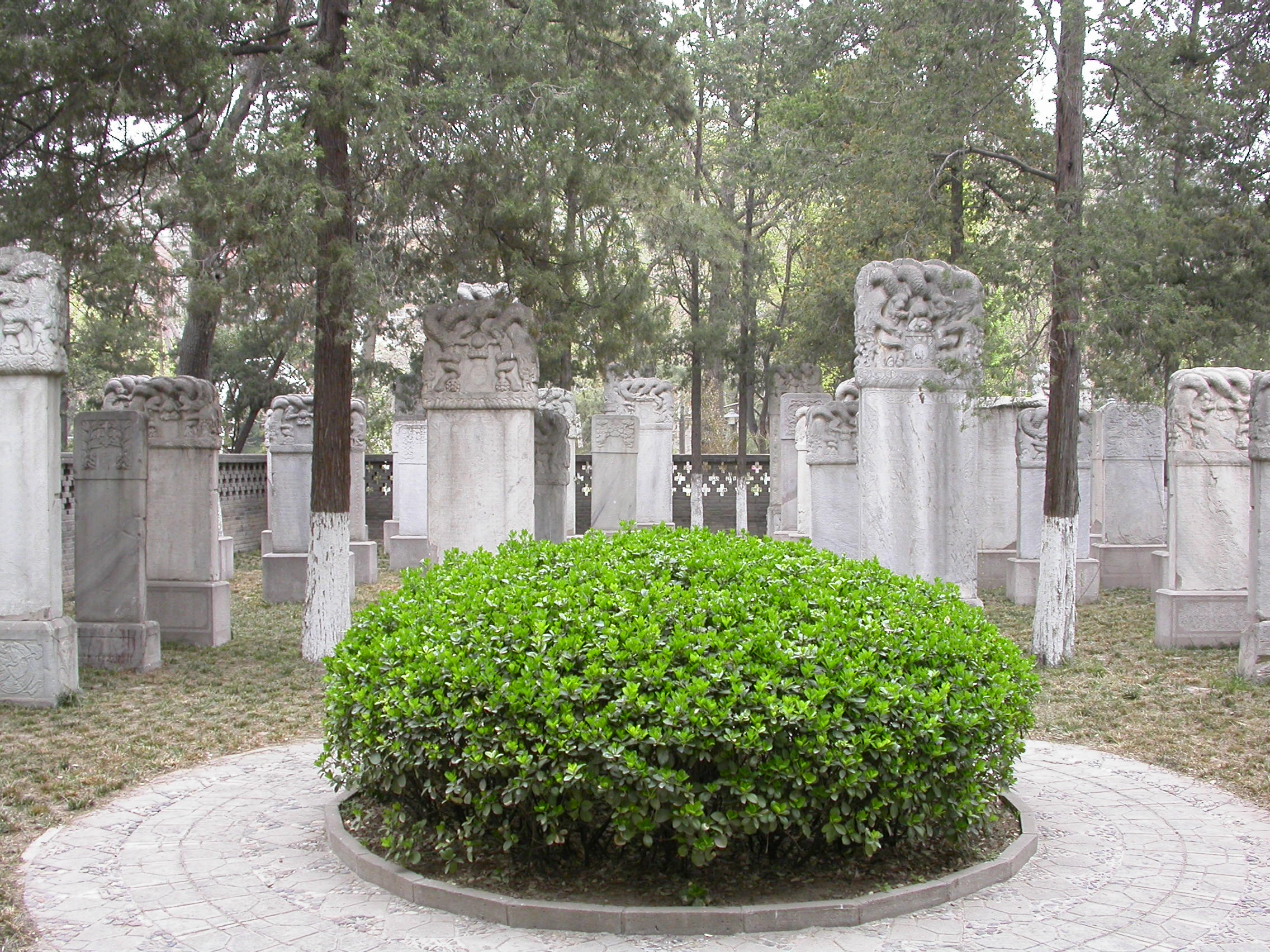
- Beijing Administration Institute
- Simplified Chinese: 北京行政学院
Transcriptions
Standard Mandarin
- Hanyu Pinyin: Běijīng Xíngzhèng Xuéyuàn

The Beijing Administration Institute (Chinese: 北京行政学院; pinyin: Běijīng Xíngzhèng Xuéyuàn), also known as the CCP Beijing Municipal Party Committee School (Chinese: 中共北京市委党校; pinyin: Zhōnggòng Běijīng Shìwěi Dǎngxiào), is a tertiary institution of learning in the Xicheng District of Beijing, China.

The institute is part of the Beijing Municipal Committee of the ruling Chinese Communist Party.

It is located at 6 Chegongzhuang Street (车公庄大街6号, Chēgōngzhuāng dàjiē 6 hào).

== Zhalan Cemetery ==
Zhalan Cemetery
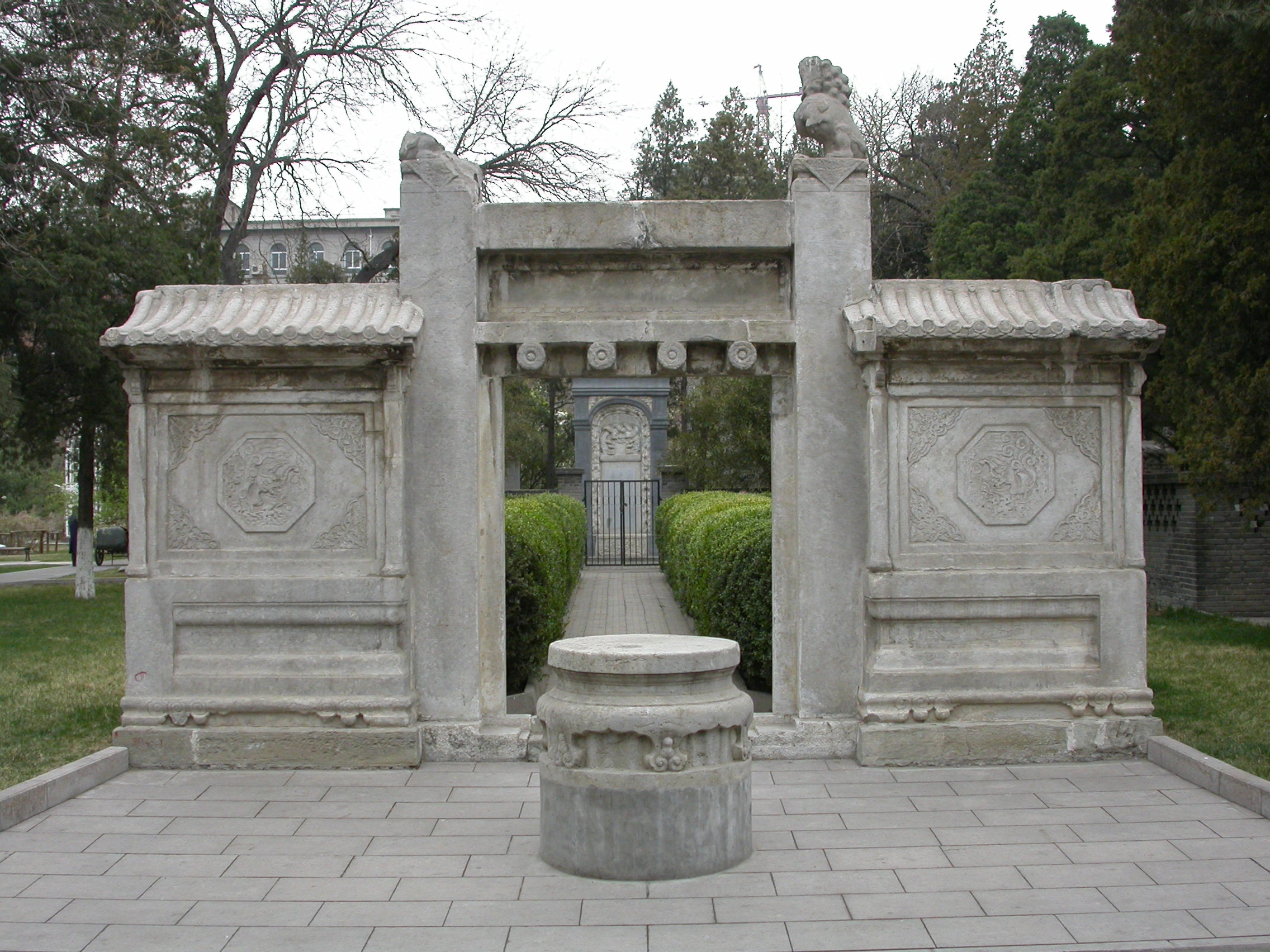
- The tomb of Matteo Ricci
- Chinese: 栅栏墓地
Transcriptions
Standard Mandarin
- Hanyu Pinyin: Zhàlán Mùdì

The college campus includes the Zhalan Cemetery which houses the remains of many of the most prominent members of the Jesuit China missions, including Matteo Ricci, Ferdinand Verbiest, and Johann Adam Schall von Bell. Since the cemetery is inside the campus, it is not open to the public.
