= Maweigou Church =

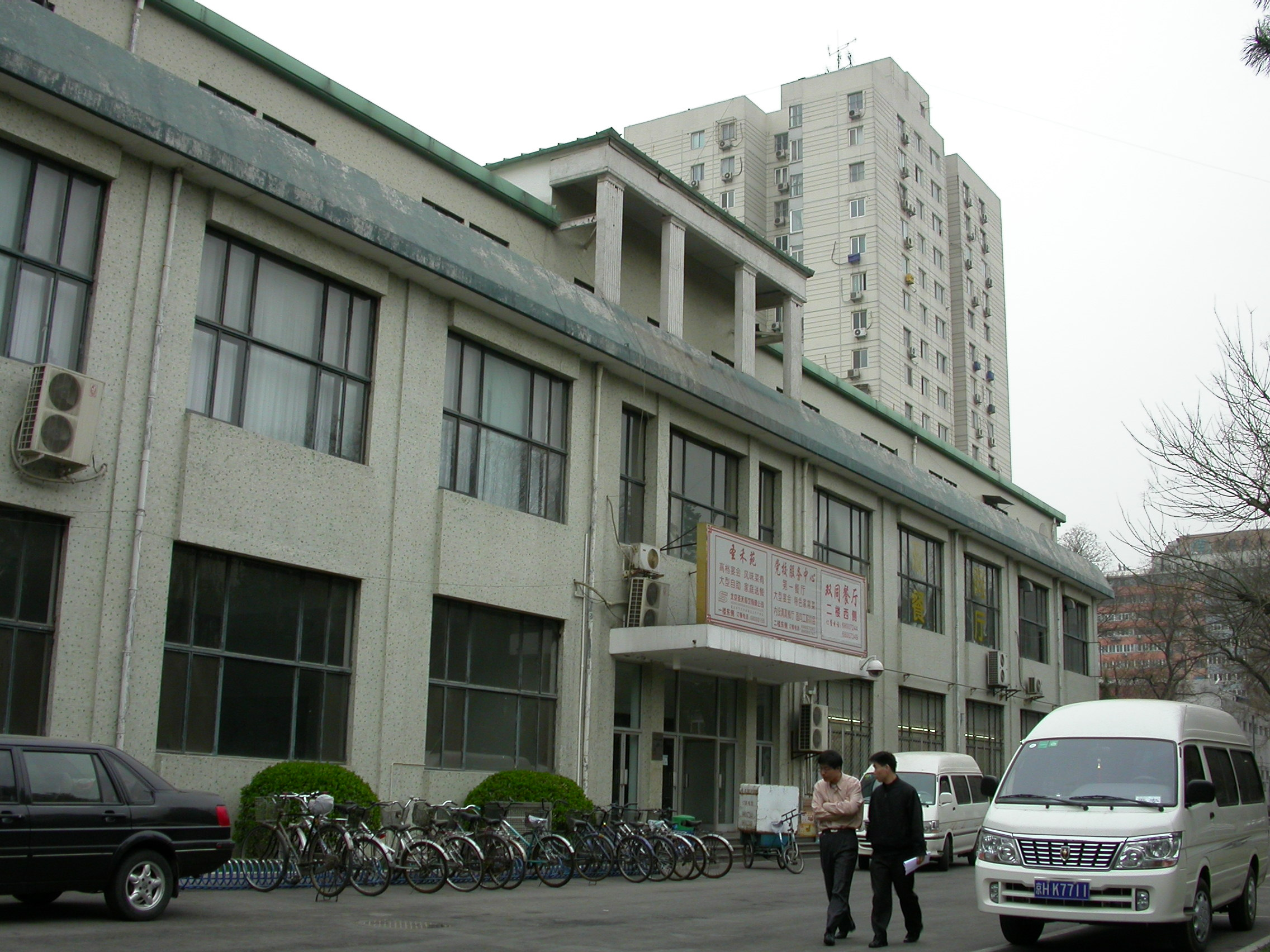

Maweigou Church (Chinese: 马尾沟教堂) was a Roman Catholic church located in Beijing, which is currently incorporated into the Beijing Administration Institute. It was formerly the home of the graves of Matteo Ricci and other foreign missionaries in Beijing; today it holds their tombstones within the campus.

== History ==
Matteo Ricci was an Italian Jesuit missionary who lived in Beijing during the late Ming period. After he died, the Wanli Emperor gifted the Catholic church this plot of land for use as his burial place. Subsequently, many other foreign missionaries of the Ming and Qing dynasties were buried in the same place.

During the Boxer Rebellion the boxers desecrated the gravesite, exhumed the remains and disposed of them. Following the Boxer Protocol, the Qing government was obliged to build new tombstones and also to pay for the erection of a new church. This church, built in 1903, was dedicated to the Virgin Mary and became known as 'Shimen church'. It was expanded in 1906 and came to include a seminary, which became one of the largest sites for training Chinese Catholic priests in pre-communist China. Future bishop Fu Tieshan attended and graduated from this seminary when it was open in the 1950s.

During the Japanese occupation of Beijing, the church and school were occupied by Japanese soldiers. The church regained use of it after the war, however, in 1949, when Chinese Communist Party (CCP) forces took over Beijing, Beijing's bishop as well as the foreign missionaries who ran this church and seminary fled China.

In 1954, some of the buildings were sold to the CCP. The CCP thereafter opened a party school that currently still stands on the site. In 1958, the Chinese Catholic Church, which had been severed from the Vatican and placed entirely under state control, gave the remainder of the site as a gift to the CCP. Thereafter the church and all of the buildings associated with the church were largely incorporated into the party school, which they mostly continue to be up to the present. The main church building itself was demolished in 1973 and the school cafeteria stands on its former location.
