= Antoine Thomas =

Belgian Jesuit priest, missionary and astronomer

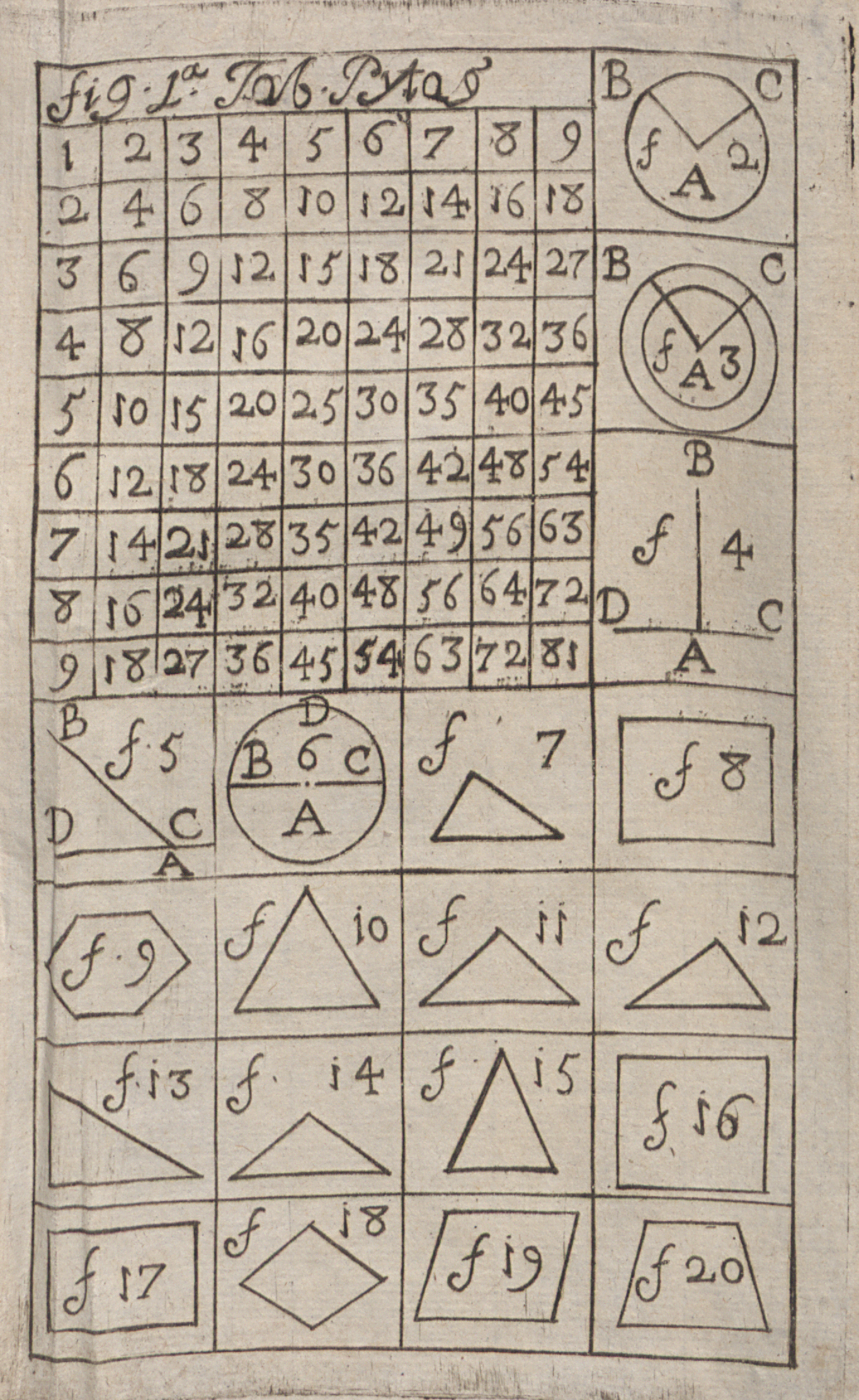
Synopsis mathematica, 1685

Antoine Thomas (25 January 1644 – 29 July 1709) was a Jesuit priest from the Spanish Netherlands, and missionary and astronomer in Qing China. His Chinese name was 安多.

== Early life ==
Born in Namur, Belgium in 1644, Thomas was educated at the city’s Jesuit college; he went on to teach philosophy, theology and rhetoric at several Jesuit schools, including Huy and Tournai. After several years of apply to be sent to China as a missionary, he was accepted for this work in 1677.

He initially travelled to Portugal to be trained for his work in Asia; he arrived at Coimbra’s Colégio das Artes where he also taught mathematics and published a two-volume textbook “Synopsis Mathematica”, funded by his patroness, Maria de Guadalupe, 6th Duchess of Aveiro. He then travelled to Siam (Thailand), where he spent eight months. He went on to Malacca and reached Macau in 1682 in time to observe an eclipse of the sun (1683).

== At the Chinese imperial court ==
Thomas was called by the ageing Father Ferdinand Verbiest, who had just found himself appointed 'vice-president of the Tribunal of Mathematics', (an influential post in the Qing Empire of China), to join him in Beijing. After the death of Verbiest in 1688, Thomas took his place as the main mathematician and astronomical expert in China. For twenty years he was then a close adviser to the Kangxi Emperor, who, beyond scientific questions, consulted him also on moral and religious matters. In 1692, he obtained an 'edict of tolerance' that gave the missionaries almost complete freedom to preach Christianity.

== Chinese Rites controversy ==
At a time when the future of the Christian faith seemed bright in China, the Chinese Rites controversy was raging in Europe. Charles-Thomas Maillard de Tournon, a papal legate, arrived in Beijing in 1705 purportedly to inquire about the orthodoxy of the Chinese rites (particularly the 'Veneration of Ancestors' ritual, accepted by the Jesuits). However, Tournon's mind was already made up. By completely disregarding Chinese customs and etiquette, he offended the Kangxi Emperor who had initially welcomed him. No pleading from Thomas, then Superior of the Jesuits in China, could prevent Tournon from issuing a decree from Nanjing (1707) obliging the missionaries under severe penalties to abolish those rites. A last desperate attempt by Thomas, beseeching the legate to defer the implementation of the decree until further news was received from Rome, fell on deaf ears.

Thomas died two years later, in Beijing, and was buried close to his friend and predecessor Ferdinand Verbiest in the Jesuits' Zhalan Cemetery in Beijing.

== Main work ==
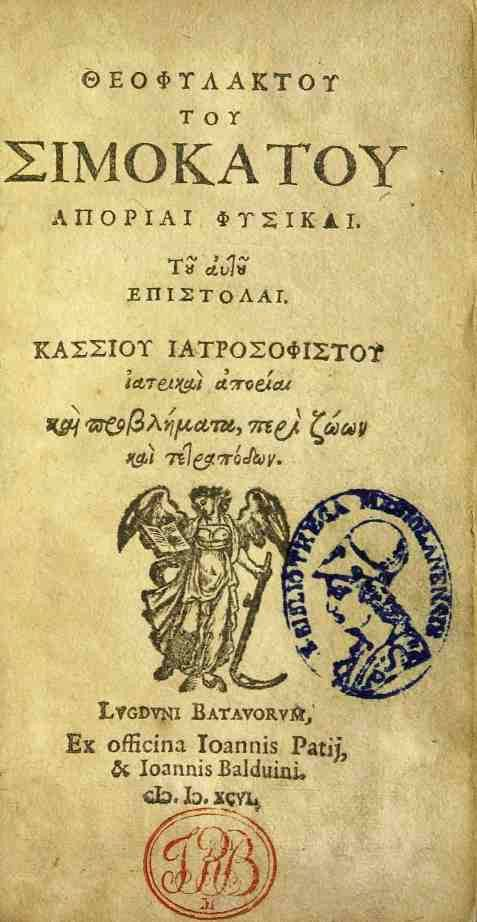
Quaestiones physicae, 1597

Synopsis mathematica, Douai, 1685.

- Eloge de René Descartes (in French). Yverdon. 1765.

== See also ==
- List of Belgians
- Religion in China
- Christianity in China
- Jesuit China missions
- Roman Catholicism in China
