= Giacomo Rho =

Italian Jesuit missionary

Giacomo Rho SJ
- Born: 1593; Milan, Duchy of Milan
- Died: 27 April 1638 (aged 44–45); Beijing, Ming China
- Resting place: Zhalan Cemetery, Beijing
- Occupation: Jesuit missionary

Giacomo Rho SJ (1593, Milan – 27 April 1638, Beijing) was an Italian Jesuit missionary in China. There he adopted the Chinese name Luo Yagu (羅雅谷) and was also known by his courtesy name Weishao (味韶).

== Life ==
Rho, the son of a jurist, entered the Society of Jesus at the age of twenty. While later proficient in mathematics, he was a poor student initially.

Following his ordination in Rome by Cardinal Bellarmine, he sailed for the Far East in 1617 with forty-four companions. After a brief stay in Goa, he proceeded to Macao. During the siege of that city by Dutch forces in 1622, he was attributed by Jesuit sources to be the one who fired a cannon shot that landed on a barrel of gunpowder in the midst of the Dutch formation, which turned the tide of the battle and saved the city from the attack. This service opened China to him.

Rho rapidly acquired knowledge of the Chinese language, and in 1631, he was summoned to Beijing by the emperor to work on reforming the Chinese calendar. Together with Johann Adam Schall von Bell, he occupied himself on this task until the end of his life seven years later, in 1638. Numerous Chinese officials attended his funeral.

Rho left works relative to the correction of the Chinese calendar and other astronomical and theological questions.

He was buried in the Jesuits' Zhalan Cemetery in Beijing.
