= Thomas Pereira =

Portuguese Jesuit (1646–1708)

Tomás Pereira
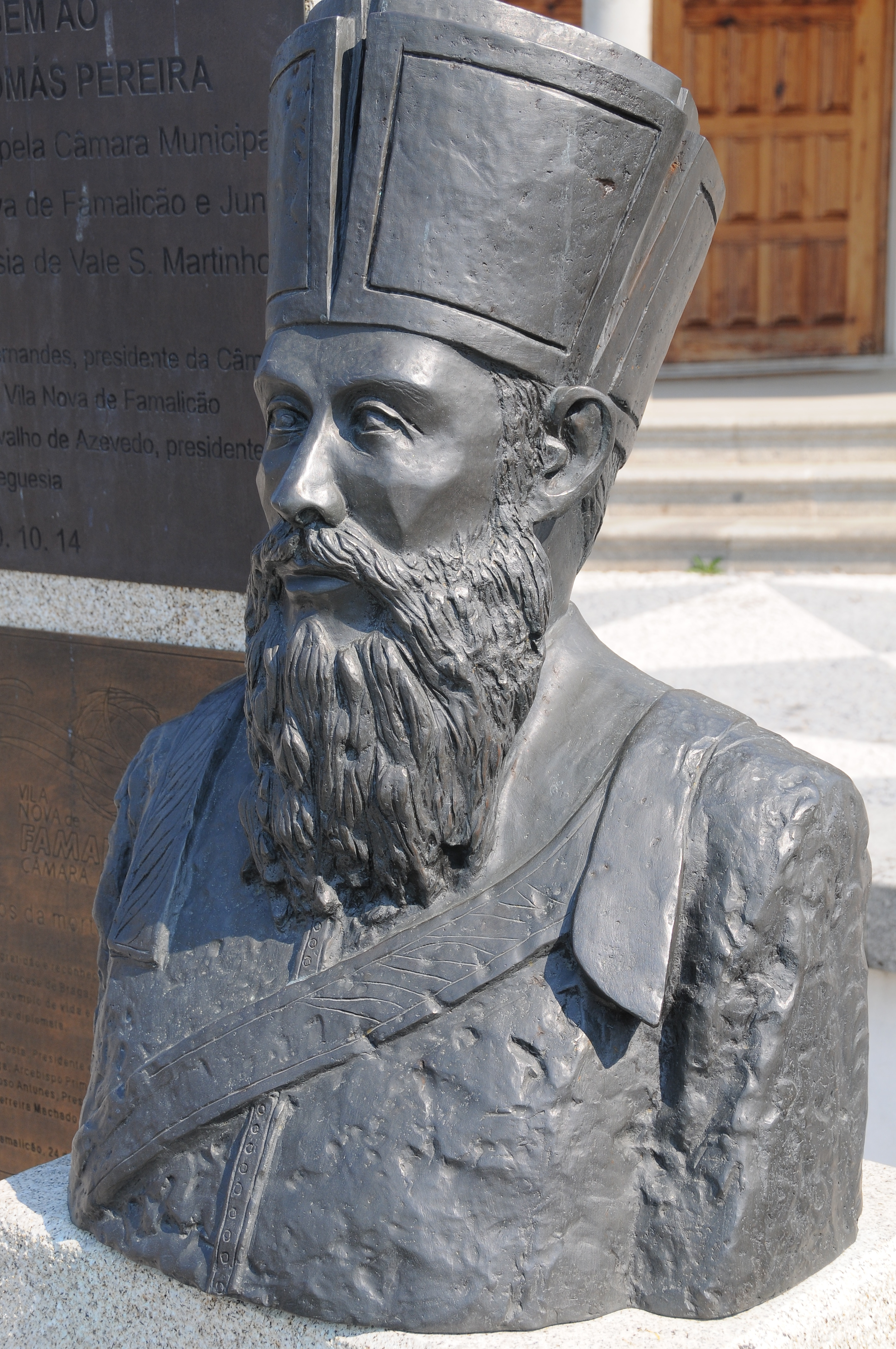
- Bust of Tomás Pereira in Vila Nova de Famalicão
- Born: Sanctos da Costa Pereira; 1 November 1645; Vila Nova de Famalicão, Kingdom of Portugal
- Died: 1708 (aged 62–63); China
- Occupations: Jesuit missionary, mathematician and scientist

Tomás Pereira (5 November 1646 – 1708) was a Portuguese Jesuit missionary who served at the court of the Kangxi Emperor in Beijing for thirty‑six years. Renowned as a musician, clockmaker and interpreter, he played a pivotal role in the negotiation of the Treaty of Nerchinsk in 1689 - the first formal agreement between China and a European power - and contributed to Kangxi's 1692 Tolerance Decree, which granted greater religious freedom to Christians in China.

== Early life and journey to China ==
Pereira was born Sanctos da Costa Pereira on 5 November 1646 in São Martinho do Vale, the second son of the noble Costa‑Pereira family. He probably received his early musical training at the Colégio de São Paulo in Braga before entering the Jesuit novitiate at Coimbra in 1663, where he took the name Tomás. In April 1666, at nineteen, he embarked with eighteen Jesuit companions on the Portuguese Indian Armadas (Portuguese: Carreira da Índia). The six‑month voyage to Goa cost seventy lives, including two missionaries; Pereira remained there from 1666 to 1671 to complete his philosophy and theology studies. After a brief stay in Macao, an imperial edict summoned him to Beijing in 1672, initiating his long service at the Kangxi court.

== Service at the Kangxi court ==
Upon his arrival, Pereira quickly gained the emperor's favour through his exceptional skill in music, clockmaking and mechanical automata. He repaired and constructed clocks and musical instruments - among them a celebrated sphaera musica in 1679 featuring self‑playing bells and a mechanical bird, and a grand organ for the Western Church in 1680, reputedly the largest in the East. Appointed Kangxi's first music teacher, he introduced Western musical theory by composing the Lülü Zuanyao (Treatise on Musical Theory), later translated into Manchu. He oversaw the Jesuit laboratory after Gabriel de Magalhães's retirement, using 'curious machines' to both entertain the court and secure continued imperial support for the mission.

== Diplomatic role ==
Fluent in Latin and versed in the jus gentium (international law), Pereira was chosen as interpreter and advisor during the Sino‑Russian negotiations at Nerchinsk in 1689. Alongside Jean-François Gerbillon, he mediated talks that established a border settlement on equal terms. This was an unprecedented outcome in Qing diplomatic history. His detailed diary of the negotiations, rediscovered in the twentieth century, has illuminated the Jesuits' role in drafting the treaty. In gratitude for their service, Kangxi issued the 1692 Tolerance Decree, which eased restrictions on Christian practice throughout the empire.

== Death and legacy ==
Pereira continued at court until his death in Beijing in 1708, which contemporaries partly attributed to strain from ecclesiastical disputes during the Chinese Rites Controversy. His technical ingenuity and cultural mediation left a lasting imprint: in 2008, on the three‑hundredth anniversary of his death, symposia and exhibitions in Portugal and China celebrated his life and work.
