= Nicolò Longobardo =

Italian missionary (1559–1654)

The Venerable Nicolò Longobardo SJ
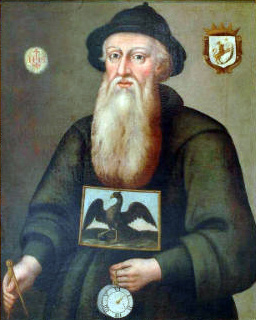
- Nicolò Longobardo (1559-1654).
- Title: Superior General of the China mission

Personal life
- Born: 10 September 1559 Caltagirone, Kingdom of Sicily
- Died: 11 December 1655 (aged 96) Beijing, Qing Empire
- Resting place: Zhalan Cemetery, Beijing

Religious life
- Religion: Catholic Church
- Order: Society of Jesus

Senior posting
- Period in office: 1610–1622
- Predecessor: Matteo Ricci
- Successor: Giovanni Aroccia

Nicolò Longobardo (1559-1654), Chinese name Long Huamin (Chinese: 龍華民), was a Sicilian Jesuit in China in the 17th century. He arrived there in 1597, and was sent to the area of Shaozhou. He became the successor of Matteo Ricci in 1610 as Superior General of the Jesuit China mission.

He was replaced as Superior by Giovanni Aroccia in 1622, but continued preaching in China until around 90 years of age.

The Jesuit's name also appears in historical sources as Nicholas Longobardi and Niccolo Longobardi, with the birth and death years given as 1565–1655.

He was buried in the Jesuits' Zhalan Cemetery in Beijing.
