= Johann Adam Schall von Bell =

German Jesuit astronomer active in China (1591–1666)

Johann Adam Schall von Bell SJ
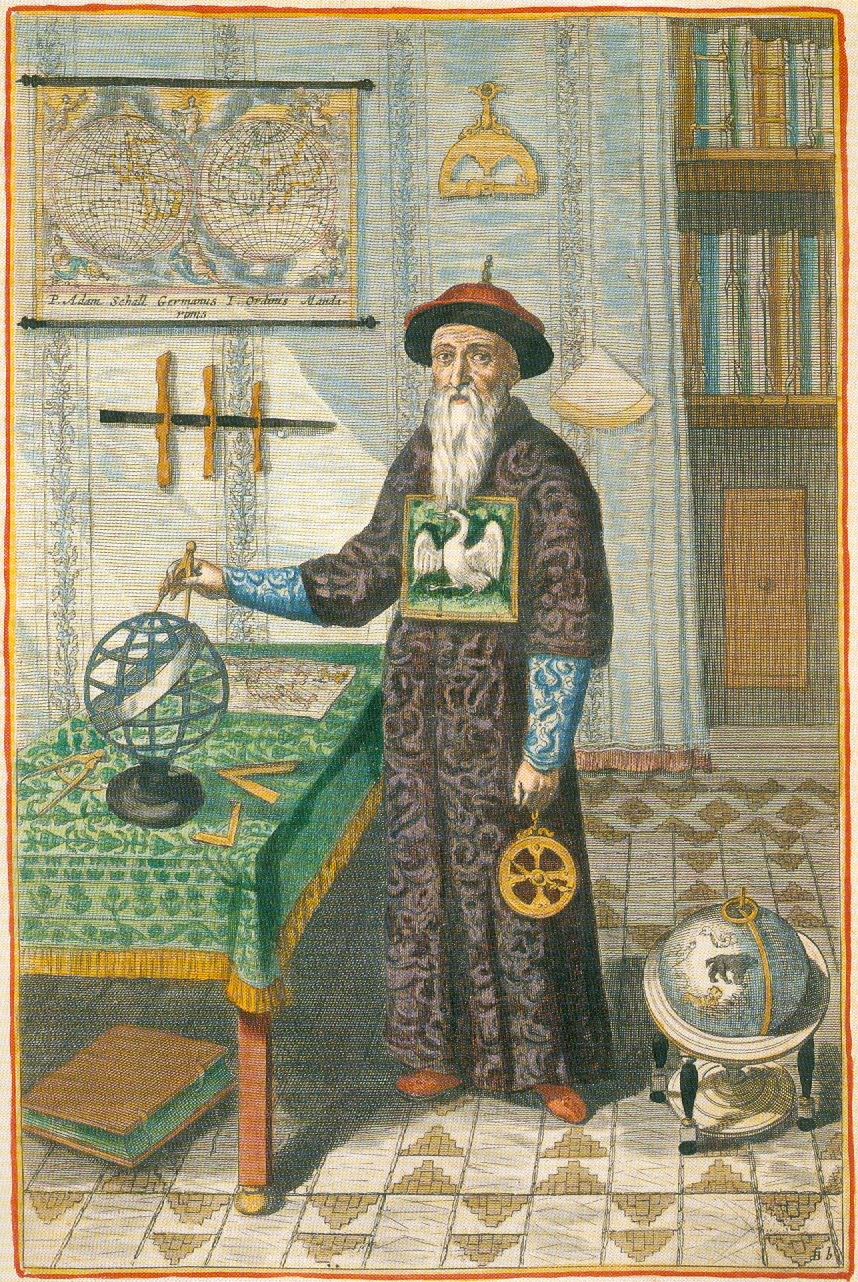
- Born: 1 May 1591; Cologne or Lüftelberg, Holy Roman Empire
- Died: 15 August 1666 (aged 75); Jingshi, Shuntian, Zhili, Qing China
- Resting place: Zhalan Cemetery, Beijing
- Education: Collegium Germanicum, Gregorianum
- Scientific career
- Fields: Astronomy, religion

Chinese name
- Traditional Chinese: 湯若望
- Simplified Chinese: 汤若望
Transcriptions
Standard Mandarin
- Hanyu Pinyin: Tāng Ruòwàng
- Wade–Giles: T'ang Jo-wang

Manchu name
- Manchu script: ᡨᠠᠩ ᡰ᠊ᠣ᠋ ᠸᠠᠩ
- Romanization: tang žo wang

Johann Adam Schall von Bell (1 May 1591 – 15 August 1666) was a German Jesuit, astronomer and instrument-maker. He spent most of his life as a missionary in China (where he is remembered as "Tang Ruowang") and became an adviser to the Shunzhi Emperor of the Qing dynasty.

== Life ==
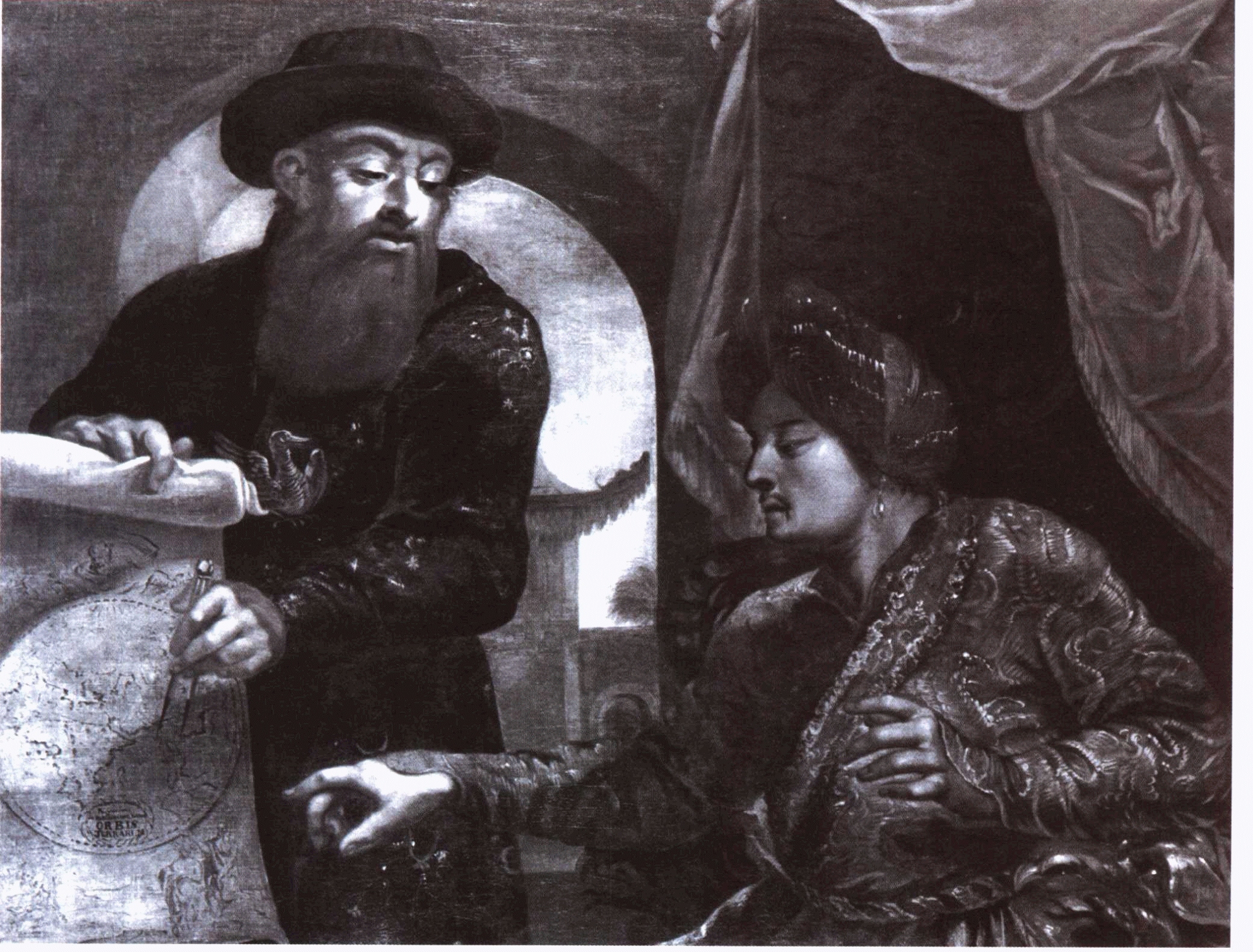
A European painting of Adam Schall dressed in mandarin robes with an Orientialized depiction of the Shunzhi Emperor

Schall von Bell was born on 1 May 1591 to noble parents in Cologne or nearby Lüftelberg (today part of Meckenheim) in the Holy Roman Empire. After he graduated from the Jesuit Gymnasium in Cologne he moved to Rome and studied subjects such as mathematics and astronomy at the Collegium Germanicum. In 1611 he joined the Society of Jesus and continued his education at the Gregorianum.

In 1618 he left for China on a Portuguese ship with a group of missionaries under the lead of Nicolas Trigault. The next year the group reached the Portuguese trading port of Macau where Schall von Bell spent some time learning Chinese. He started missionary work inside China in 1622, but allegedly his success was limited. He participated in the defence of Macau from a Dutch invasion in the same year, and personally took a Dutch captain prisoner from that victorious battle.

Schall von Bell and Giacomo Rho were sent to Beijing in 1630 to continue the work of the deceased Johann Schreck on a reform of the Chinese calendar. With Xu Guangqi, he participated in modifying the Chinese calendar and compiling what is known as the Chongzhen calendar. Named after the Chongzhen Emperor, the last emperor of the Ming dynasty, the modified calendar provided more accurate predictions of eclipses of the sun and the moon. Upon Xu's passing, he held the requiem in his honour and oversaw the process of shipping the body back to his relatives in Shanghai. The Ming obtained the services of Father von Bell’s foundry in Beijing, which is said to have produced some five hundred cannon.

After the Ming-Qing Transition in 1644, Schall von Bell gained access to the newly installed Shunzhi Emperor and became one of his trusted counsellors. He was made a mandarin and held an important post in connection with the mathematical school: Director of the Imperial Observatory and the Tribunal of Mathematics.

His position enabled him to procure from the emperor permission for the Jesuits to build churches and to preach throughout the country. Thus Schall von Bell is indirectly credited with 500,000 Chinese that are said to have been baptised by Jesuit missionaries within fourteen years, making him a successful missionary.

The Shunzhi Emperor died in 1661 and Schall von Bell's position started to erode. In 1664 he was challenged by Yang Guangxian and the Muslim astronomers, who accused him of planning a rebellion and of having wilfully miscalculated time and place of a funeral and in that way contributed to the death of Consort Donggo. Schall von Bell and other Jesuits, Ferdinand Verbiest included, were imprisoned. Schall von Bell had a stroke in prison. At trial, Verbiest spoke in his defence, but all were condemned to death. However, after an earthquake, the Jesuits were pardoned and only five Chinese Christians working in the astronomical office were executed. The Jesuits were exiled to Macau. Schall von Bell died within one year of his release, on 15 August 1666. He was buried in the Jesuits' Zhalan Cemetery in Beijing.

Yang Guangxian succeeded as the head astronomer at the court. Four years later, however, the young Kangxi Emperor replaced him with Verbiest, and von Bell's honours were fully restored.

A collection of Schall von Bell's manuscripts was deposited in the Vatican Library.

== Dispute ==
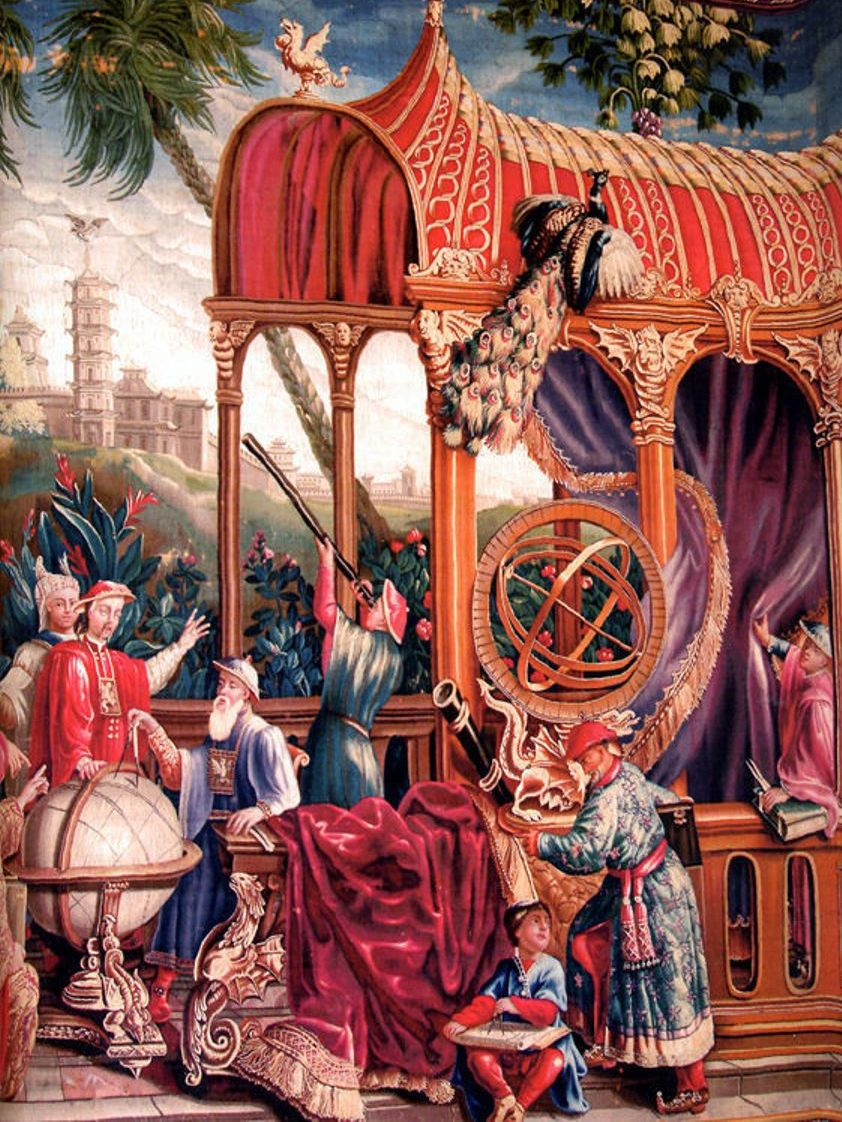
Jesuit astronomers with the Kangxi Emperor.

In 1758, an allegation, which is disputed by most Jesuits and Catholic historians, was made public. The secretary to Monsignor Charles-Thomas Maillard De Tournon reported that during the final years of his life, Schall von Bell lived "separated from the other missionaries and removed from obedience to his superiors, in the house given him by the emperor with a woman whom he treated as his wife and who bore him two children."

No evidence was provided and the allegations are even contradicted by contemporaneous witnesses and official Chinese documents. It is stated that if true, the story would almost certainly have been reported by others who sought to discredit Schall von Bell and other Jesuits. In addition, the Jesuit structure would most likely have reported the fact to authorities at higher levels of the order.

The 1912 Catholic Encyclopedia suggests that the source of the rumour was most likely the adoption by Schall von Bell of the son of a former Chinese servant.

== Encounter with Prince Sohyeon ==
Crown Prince Sohyeon, first son of King Injo of the Korean Joseon dynasty, was held hostage in Shenyang and later in Beijing. He was highly interested in Western sciences and visited Schall von Bell.

Schall von Bell gave him books on Western sciences as well as on the Catholic faith that drew the crown prince's interest. Prince Sohyeon suddenly died when he entered Korea in 1645, which dissipated Schall von Bell's hope to extend the Jesuit's missionary work into Korea.

== Continued cultural relevance in China ==
In 1992, Taiwan issued a commemorative stamp for the 400th anniversary of the birth of Schall von Bell, noting "with all his accomplishments his place in Chinese history is secure".

In 2013, Chinese CCTV published a documentary on Schall von Bell, as part of its series Biographies. At the very end of the film, the commentator noted that the Chongzhen calendar edited by Schall von Bell is still in use today. China International Communication Center's major biographical series of six Westerners in premodern China also featured Schall von Bell. He is also visible in Chinese soap operas, partly because he was close to Shunzhi Emperor and palace drama is the most popular genre on Chinese TV.

== See also ==
- Religion in China
- Jesuit China missions
- Christianity in China
- Christianity in Korea
