= China and the Christian Impact =

1982 book by Jacques Gernet

China and the Christian Impact was published in 1985 as the English translation of Jacques Gernet's Chine et christianisme of 1982. It received considerable attention from academic circles dealing with China and the Jesuit mission, mainly because of its approach to the subject from an almost exclusively Chinese point of view. In this Gernet differs much from previous studies on the China mission, the most famous up to that point perhaps being the Jesuit George Dunne's Generation of Giants (1962), which analyzes the Jesuit China mission from a decidedly eurocentric perspective. In spite of the wide range of source material consulted by its author, Gernet's book has been criticized on account of its apparent anachronisms, and lack of explanatory background information when dealing with historically related events.

== See also ==
- Jesuit China missions

== Sources ==
- Gernet, Jacques, Chine et christianisme. Action et réaction, Paris: Gallimard, 1982. (reedited in 1991 as Chine et christianisme. La première confrontation)
- Gernet, Jacques and Lloyd, Janet (transl.), China and the Christian Impact. A Conflict of Cultures, Cambridge: Cambridge University Press, 1985

== Reviews ==
- Ching, Julia in: History of religions 27(1), August 1987
- Barrett, T.H. in: Journal of Ecclesiastical History 38 (1), January 1987
- Cohen, Paul A. in: Harvard Journal of Asiatic Studies 47 (2), 1987
- Pratt, Keith in: Bulletin of the School of Oriental and African Studies 51 (1), 1988
- Mungello, David E. in: Catholic Historical Review 74 (1), January 1988
- Spence, Jonathan D. in: China Quarterly 108, 1986
- Simon Leys : The Burning Forest, August 1988
