= Christian Herdtrich =

Austrian Jesuit missionary (1625–1684)

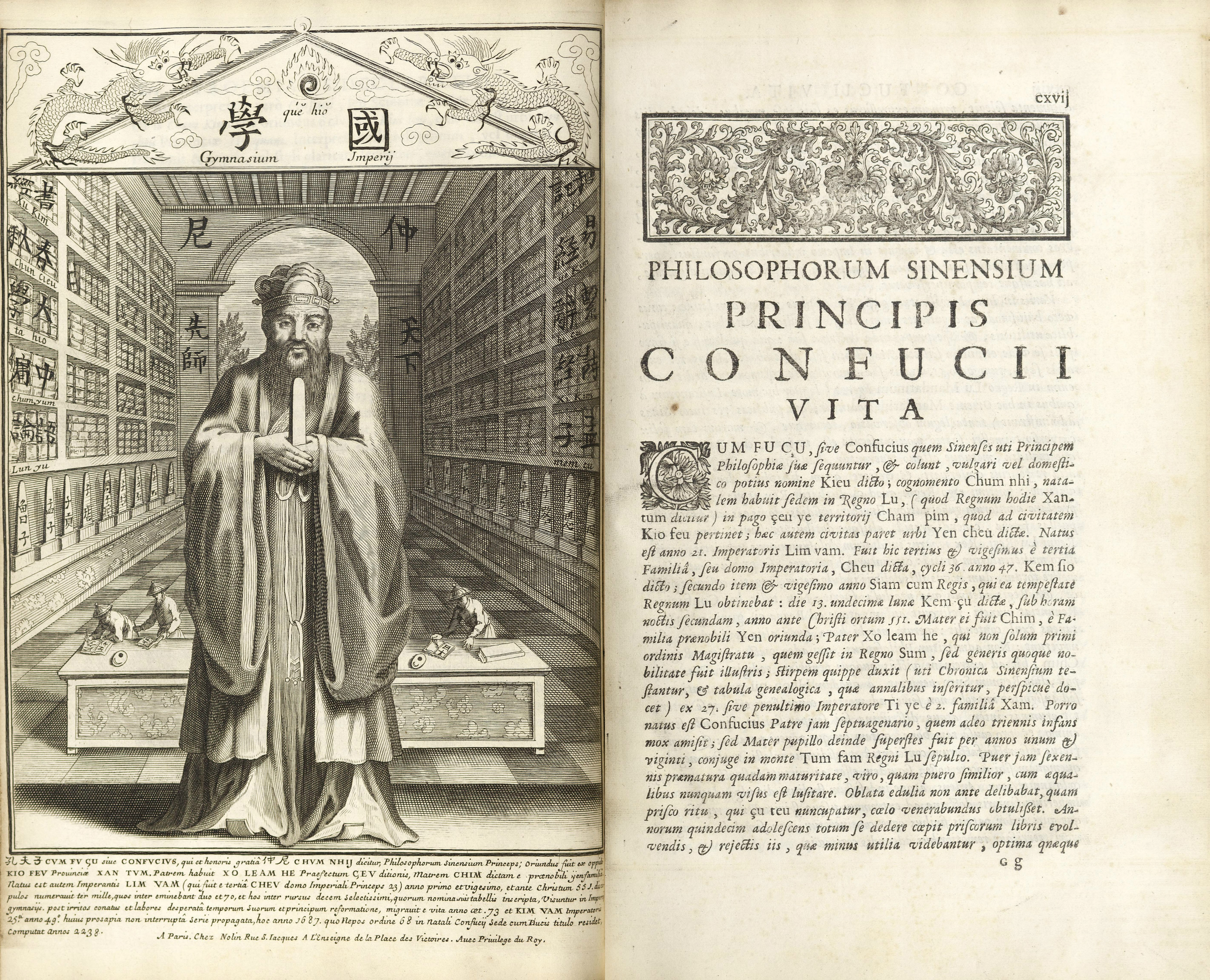
Confucius, Philosopher of the Chinese, or, Chinese Knowledge Explained in Latin (1687), to which Herdtrich contributed.

Christian Wolfgang Herdtrich (Note: According to Franco, Christianus Henriques; Chinese, Ngen.) (25 June 1625 – 18 July 1684) was an Austrian Jesuit missionary to the Qing Empire. As he wrote his works in Latin, he is also known as Christianus Herdtrich.

== Life ==
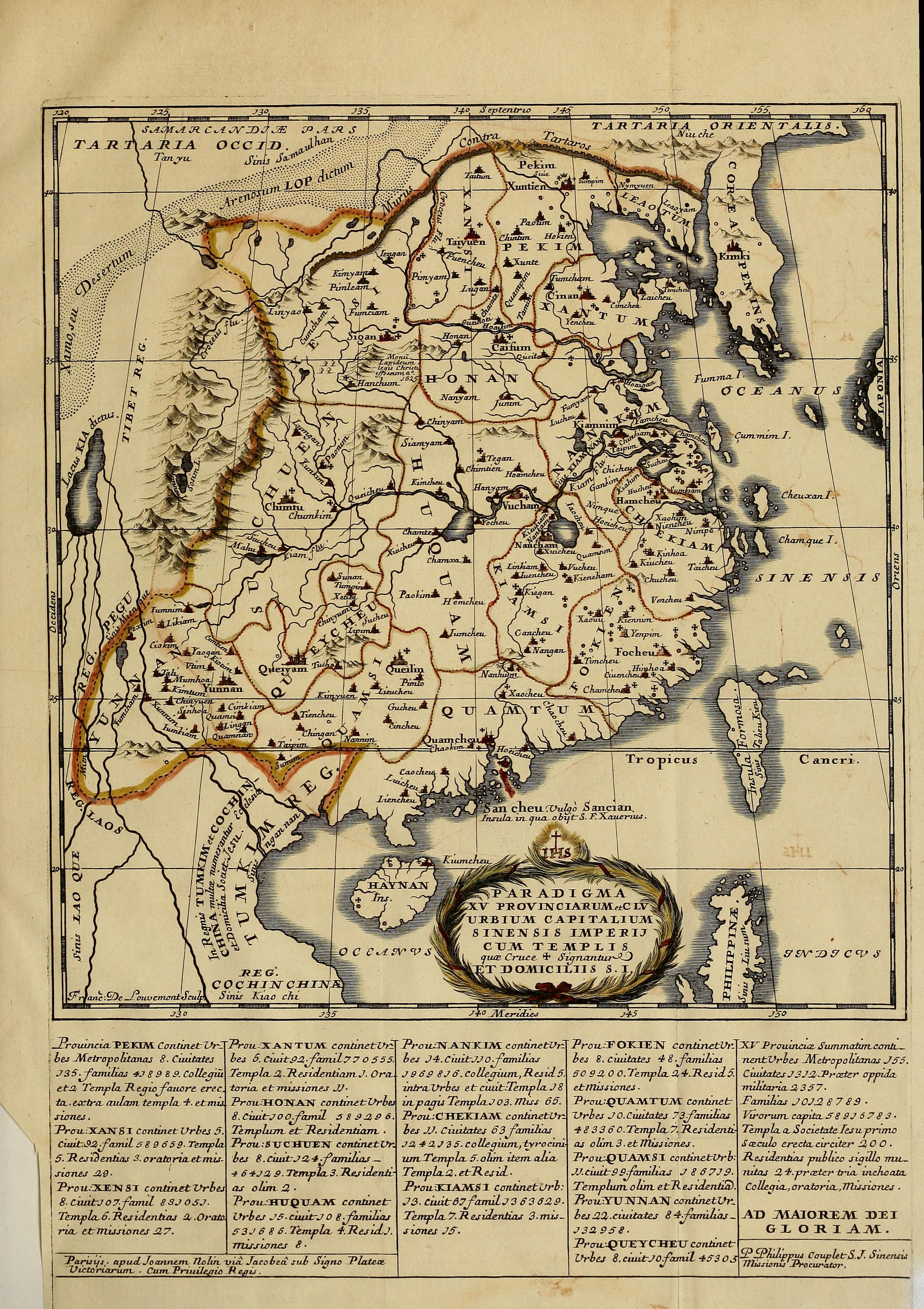
The map of China in the Confucius Sinarum Philosophus, with Couplet's notes about Chinese demographics.

Christian Wolfgang Herdtrich was born at Graz, Styria, in the Austrian Empire on 25 June 1625.

Herdtrich entered the Austrian province of the Society of Jesus on 27 October 1641, and in 1656 was chosen for the Chinese mission. For two years he laboured on the island of Sulawesi ("Celebes"). After 1660, he moved to the Chinese provinces of Shanxi and Henan. In 1671, he was called to the imperial court in Beijing as a mathematician; there, he joined a group of scholarly Jesuits with whom the Kangxi Emperor surrounded himself. The last nine years of his life were spent as superior of the mission of "Kiang-tcheon" in Shanxi.

He died in Canton in 1684. The Kangxi Emperor himself wrote on Herdtrich's epitaph.

== Works ==
Herdtrich professed a profound knowledge of the Chinese language and literature. He collaborated with Philippe Couplet, Prospero Intorcetta, and François de Rougemont in compiling Confucius, the Philosopher of the Chinese (Latin: Confucius Sinarum Philosophus), a major introduction to Chinese history and thought that was published in Paris in 1687. Herdtrich was also the author of a large Chinese-Latin dictionary (Wentse-Ko), probably one of the first of its kind.
