= Bento de Góis =

Portuguese explorer and missionary (1562–1607)

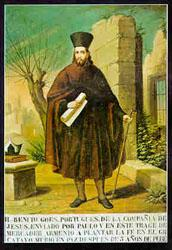
- Born: 1562; Vila Franca do Campo, Azores, Kingdom of Portugal
- Died: 11 April 1607 (aged 44 or 45); Suzhou, Gansu, Ming China
- Occupations: Jesuit missionary, explorer
- Known for: First European to travel overland from India to China

Bento de Góis (1562 – 11 April 1607) was a Portuguese Jesuit missionary and explorer. His name is commonly given in English as Bento de Goes or Bento de Goës; in the past, it has also been Anglicized as Benedict Goës.

He is mainly remembered as the first known European to travel overland from India to China, via current-day Afghanistan and the Pamir Mountains. Inspired by controversies among the Jesuits as to whether the Cathay of Marco Polo's stories is the same country as China, his expedition conclusively proved that the two countries are one and the same, and, according to Henry Yule, made "Cathay... finally disappear from view, leaving China only in the mouths and minds of men".

== Early life ==
Góis was born in 1562 in Vila Franca do Campo, Azores, Portugal and went to Portuguese India as a soldier in the Portuguese army. In Goa, he entered the Society of Jesus as a lay brother (in 1584) and offered himself to work for the Mughal mission. As such, in 1595, he accompanied Jerome Xavier and Manuel Pinheiro to Lahore. For the third time, Emperor Akbar had requested Jesuits to be sent to his court. Góis returned to Goa in 1601. According to Matteo Ricci, the experiences allowed Góis to become fluent in the Persian language and "Saracen" (Muslim) customs.

== Riddle of Cathay ==
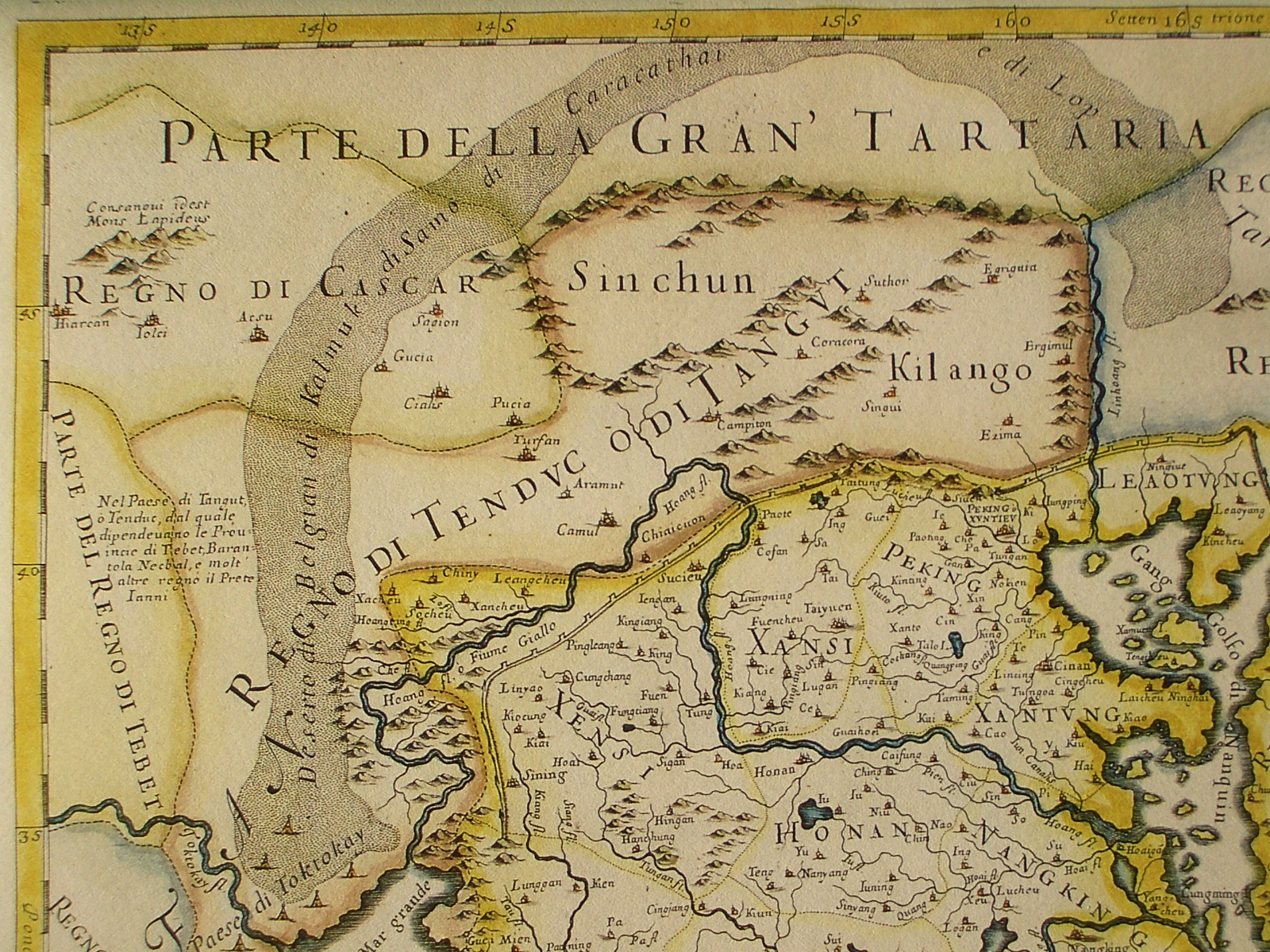
The chain of cities from Hiarcan to Cialis to Sucieu in the Regno di Cascar (Kingdom of Kashgar) on this 17th-century map is the same as the list of places listed in Ricci's account of Góis's expedition. The map mentions accounts of "Benedetto Goes", Martino Martini, Gio(vanni) Grueber, and Mr. Tavernier among its sources.

Góis is best remembered for his long exploratory journey through Central Asia, under the garb of an Armenian merchant, in search of the Kingdom of Cathay. Generated by accounts made by Marco Polo and later by the claims of Ruy Gonzales de Clavijo, reports had been circulating in Europe for over three centuries of the existence of a Christian kingdom in the midst of Muslim nations. After the Jesuit missionaries, led by Ricci, had spent over 15 years in southern China and finally reached Beijing in 1598, they came to strongly suspect that China was Cathay; the belief was strengthened by the fact that all "Saracen" (Central Asian Muslim) travellers met by Ricci and his companions in China told them that they were in Cathay.

The Jesuit leadership in Goa had been informed by letters from Jesuits in China that China was Cathay but that there were no Christians there. At the same time, the Jesuits stationed at the Mughal court (in particular, Xavier himself) were told by visiting merchants that one could reach Cathay via Kashgar and that there were many Christians in Cathay, which convinced Xavier that Cathay was the kingdom of Prester John rather than it being Ming China.

The Central Asian Muslim informants' idea of the Ming China being a heavily-Christian country may be explained by numerous similarities between Christian and Buddhist ecclesiastical rituals, which would make the two religions appear similar to a Muslim merchant. A large number of mostly-Nestorian Christians had been in China and Moghulistan in the Yuan era, over a century before Góis. While Góis' expedition was being prepared, the most widely-read account of "Cathay" in the Persian- and Turkic-speaking Muslim world was perhaps the travelogue of Ghiyāth al-dīn Naqqāsh from 1420 to 1422, which does not mention any Christians within the border of Ming China, but some editions of it mention "kafir worshiping the cross" in Turfan and Cumul).

After some communications between Xavier, the order's superiors in Goa, Niccolò Pimenta, the father visitor in charge there), and the authorities in Europe, it was decided to send an expedition overland from India to the Cathay mentioned by the Mughals' Agra to the Jesuits to find out what the country really was. Góis was chosen as the most suitable person for this expedition, as a man of courage and good judgment who was familiar with the region's language and customs. Akbar approved of the plans as well; he issued Góis with letters of safe conduct to be used during the part of the trip within the Mughal Empire, and he provided some of the funds for the expedition.

Additionally, he assisted the chief consort of Akbar in the year 1595, when Mariam-uz-Zamani was travelling to a certain place, she was robbed of all her possessions and was left without the ordinary necessities of life. Jesuit Benedict Goes hearing this assisted her as far as his means permitted. When this news was delivered to Akbar's court, there was great astonishment among the attendants of the court. Goes was then praised and thanked at the court for assisting the queen as the assistance she sought from her countrymen was delivered to her by a stranger. When Mariam-uz-Zamani reached Akbar's court safely, many people, with gifts in their hands, went forth from the city to welcome her. A message was then sent to Prince Salim, who was at a distance of eight days from the Agra, came in haste to see his mother and two days post arriving at the capital, he met Benedict for which Salim personally came out to receive him. As per the custom of the country, Goes would have embraced Salim’s feet but Salim did not permit him and immediately raised him kindly by his arm, made enquiries for his health and ordered full repayment of the advances he lent to his mother.

== In Cathay ==
Góis left Agra for Lahore in late 1602 or early 1603 (sources differ), and in February 1603, he left Lahore with the annual caravan bound for Kashgaria's capital, Yarkand. His cover identity was that of an Armenian merchant with a somewhat unlikely name Abdullah Isái. He was accompanied by two Greeks chosen by Xavier: a priest, Leo Grimano, who travelled to Kabul, and a merchant, Demetrios, who also separated from Góis in Kabul but later rejoined him in Yarkand. Instead of the four servants given to him in Agra, he hired in Lahore a real Armenian residing in that city, Isaac, who accompanied Góis to the very end.

Traveling via Peshawar, the caravan reached Kabul, where the caravan members spent several months. While in Kabul, Góis met "Agahanem", the sister of the ruler of Kashgaria, who was also the mother of the current ruler of Hotan. She was returning to her homeland from a hajj to Mecca and had run out of money. The Jesuit lent her some funds, which she later repaid with quality jade.

From another traveler he met, Góis learned about the existence of "a city called Capperstam, into which no Mahomedan is allowed to enter" (according to Yule, a reference to the region of Kafiristan), and he got a taste of the local people's wine, which he found quite similar to European wine.

From Kabul, Góis and Isaac went north, crossing the Hindu Kush. Having left the domain of the Moghuls and entered the territory under the authority (at least nominally) of the Khan of Samarcand, Ferghana, and Bukhara, they made a stop in Taloqan ("Talhan") in today's northern Afghanistan. The area was in turmoil, with the "Calcia" people, "of light hair and beard like the Belgians" being in rebellion against the Bukharan rulers.

While "Galcha" is an archaic term that referred a broad number of people, which cannot be directly matched to any single modern ethnic group, it was described by at least one author as a name used by lowland Tajiks for the Pamiri people.

Having passed through the land of the Calcia rebels with only minor losses, the caravan continued eastward, on dangerous roads across the Pamirs. Neither Yule in 1866, nor Cornelius Wessels in 1924, was able to identify most of the places mentioned by Góis, but they mentioned that his was probably the only published account of a European crossing the region between the expedition of Marco Polo and the 19th century. The caravan reached Yarkand ("Hiarchan") in November 1603.

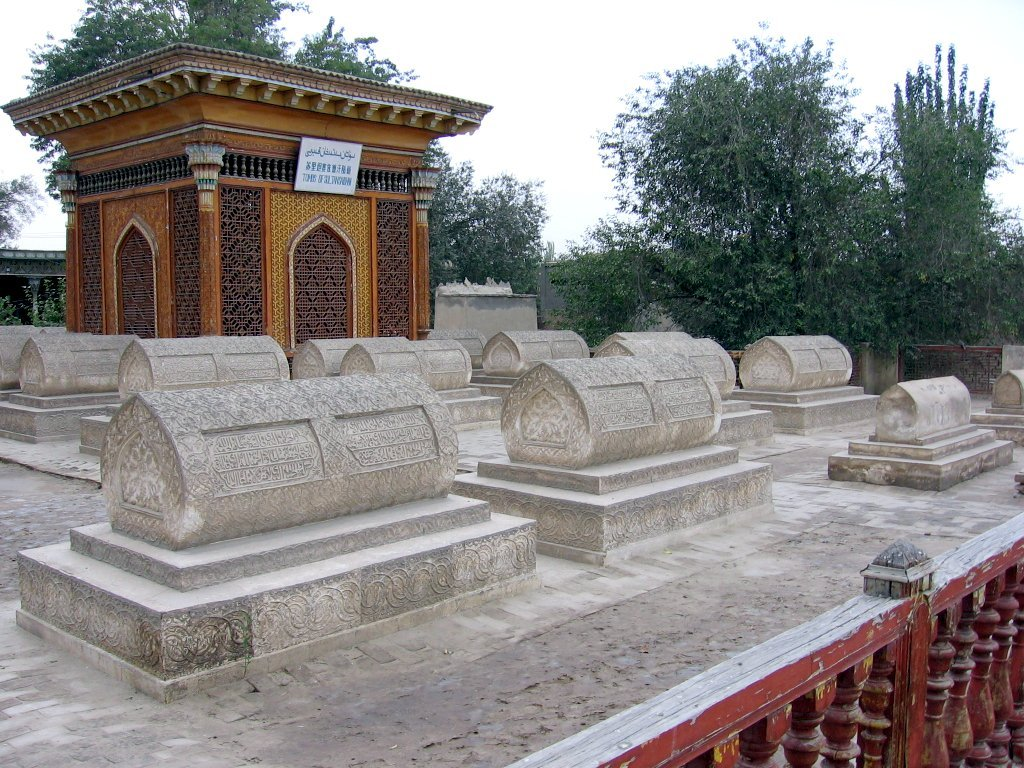
Royal tombs in Yarkand, dating from the 16–17th centuries

Yarkand had been the capital of Kashgaria (western Tarim Basin) since the days of Abu Bakr Khan (ca. 1500). Góis and Isaac spent a year there to wait for the formation and departure of a caravan to Cathay. They knew that every few years a caravan would leave Yarkand, with primarily of local merchants carrying jade to the capital of Cathay (i.e., Beijing) under the guise of "tribute" to the Ming Emperor, from various Central Asian rulers. According to the custom, the emperor would choose the best jade for himself, generously reimbursing the Kashgarians, and the rest of the jade could be sold to Beijing merchants. Góis also made a side trip to Hotan, where his earlier loan to the principality's queen mother was generously rewarded with jade.

The Jesuit impressed the Yarkand-based ruler of Kashgaria Muhammad Sultan (r. 1592–1609), a descendant of Sultan Said Khan and a murid of Khoja Ishaq, with a gift of a mechanical watch and obtained from him a document for entry into the eastern "Kingdom of Cialis", which was ruled by Muhammad's son.

The jade-laden "tribute" caravan left Yarkand in November 1604. They made a stop in Aksu, Xinjiang, which was still within Kashgarian Kingdom, and had Muhammad Sultan's 12-year-old nephew as its nominal ruler. The Jesuit befriended the boy with some sweets and a performance of a European dance and his mother with a variety of small gifts.

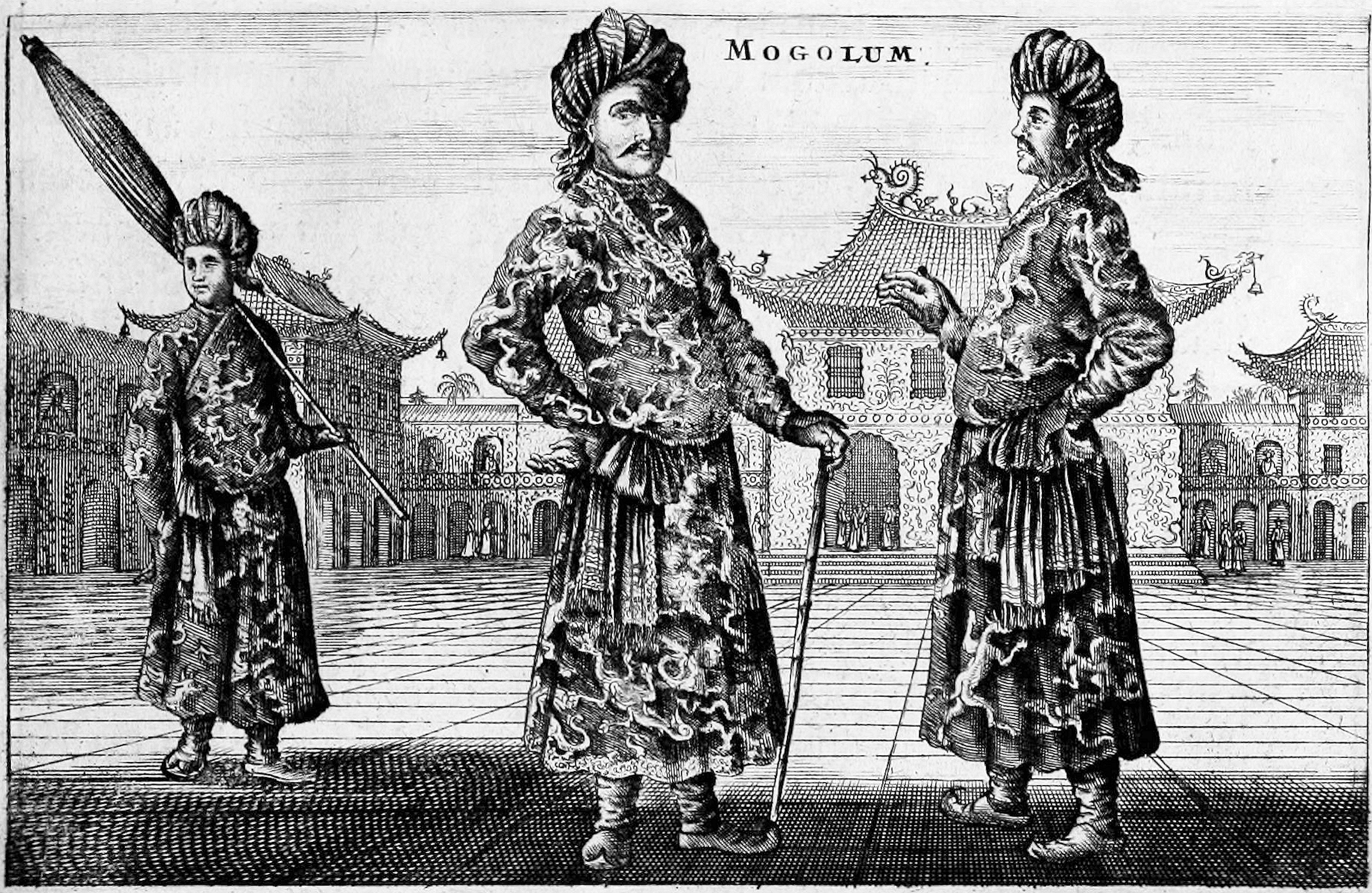
A mission from (apparently) Turpan visiting Beijing in 1656, half a century after de Góis' journey. His caravan may have included similar personages.

The caravan then crossed the "desert of Caracathai", or "the Black Land of the Cathayans", which Góis learned was named after the "Cathayans [who] had lived there for a long time". The next major stop was the small but strongly-fortified city of Cialis, where the travelers spent three months, as the caravan's chief waited for more merchants to join. Although it follows from the geography of the route (between Kucha and Turpan) that Cialis had to be located somewhere within today's Bayin'gholin Mongol Autonomous Prefecture, its identity has been a subject of speculation among later historians. Some thought that it was the city known to us as Korla (today, the capital of the prefecture), But others opined for Karashar, some 50 km farther to the northeast.

It was in Cialis that Bento's caravan met with another caravan, returning from Beijing to Kashgaria. As the luck would have it, during their stay in Beijing, or "Cambalu", in Turkic, the Kashgarians had resided at the same facility for accommodating foreign visitors where Ricci, the first Jesuit to reach the Chinese capital, had been detained for a while. The returning Kashgarians told Góis what they knew about this new, unusual species of visitors to China, and they even showed him a piece of scrap paper with something written in Portuguese, apparently dropped by one of the Jesuits, which they had picked as a souvenir to show to their friends back home. Góis was overjoyed, now sure that the China Jesuits had been right identifying Marco Polo's Cathay as China and Cambalu as Beijing.

== Stuck in Suzhou ==
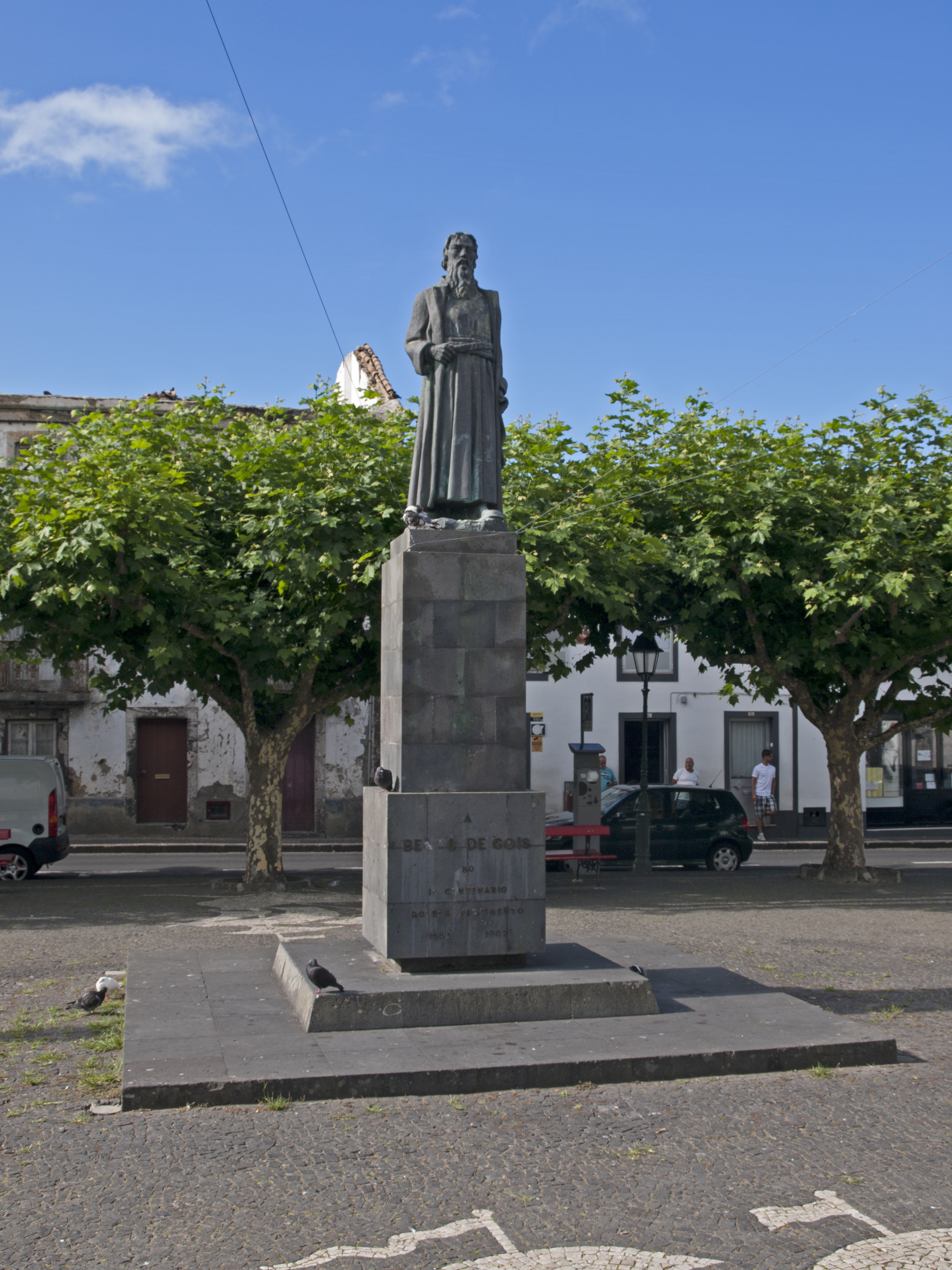
Monument to Góis in Vila Franca do Campo

Via Turpan and Hami, his caravan reached the Chinese border at Jiayuguan and soon obtained the permission to cross the Great Wall and to proceed to Suzhou (now Jiuquan City center), the first city within the Ming Empire, which they entered near the end of 1605. After three years and 4,000 miles (6,400 km) of arduous travel, Bento and Isaac had 13 horses, five hired servants, and two boys that Bento had redeemed out of slavery. They carried plenty of precious jade with them, and, most importantly, both travelers were in good health.

However, here his luck ran out. The Ming Empire had fairly restrictive rules for foreigners' entry into the country, and it would take many months before the Central Asian merchants/"ambassadors" would be allowed to proceed into the interior of the country. In the meantime, Bento and Isaac, virtually imprisoned in the border city, had to spend their assets to feed themselves at the exorbitant prices prevailing there. Góis wrote a letter to the Jesuits in Beijing asking them to find a way to get him out of Suzhou, but it was not delivered, as he did not know the address of his colleagues in Beijing, and apparently he could not even ask anyone to have the letter addressed in Chinese. On their end, the Beijing Jesuits (informed about Góis's expedition by his Goa superiors) were making inquiries about him from people coming from the west, but they could not learn anything either since they did not know his "Armenian" name, or they asked the wrong people.

Góis's second letter, sent around Easter 1606, made it to Beijing in mid-November. Despite the winter weather, Ricci promptly sent a Chinese Jesuit lay brother, Giovanni Fernandes, to his rescue.

Despite inclement weather and the theft of many of his supplies by his servant in Xi'an, Fernandes made it to Suzhou, Gansu in late March 1607 and found Bento sick and almost at the point of death. (Ricci says that he may have been poisoned.) The intrepid traveler died 11 days after Fernandes's arrival on 11 April, and the other members of his caravan, pursuant to their "diabolical custom", divided his property among themselves.

It took several months of legal efforts for Giovanni and Isaac to recover some of Góis's property and papers from his former caravan travellers. Unfortunately, his travel journal, which he was said to have kept meticulously, had been destroyed by the "Saracen" caravan people, supposedly because it also contained records of the amounts of funds that some of them owed to him. Therefore, records of his expedition are very sketchy, based primarily on the several surviving letters (several sent back to India and the last one, to Ricci) and on information obtained by Ricci from Isaac and Giovanni.

Isaac and Giovanni buried Góis's in as Christian manner as it was possible under the circumstances, and they went to Beijing. After being debriefed by Ricci during a month's stay in Beijing, Isaac returned to India, via Macau and the Strait of Singapore, with more adventures on the way.

== See also ==
- Matteo Ricci
- António de Andrade
- Cornelius Wessels

== Bibliography ==
- Wessels, Cornelius (1992). Early Jesuit travellers in Central Asia, 1603-1721. Asian Educational Services. pp. 1–42. ISBN 81-206-0741-4. (Reprint of the 1924 edition)
- Bernard, H., Le frère Bento de Goes chez les musulmans de la Haute-Asie, Tientsin, 1934.
- Bishop, G.,In Search of Cathay, Anand, 1998.
- Cronin, V., The Wise Man From the West, Harvill Press, 2003
- Findly, Ellison Banks (April–June 1988). "The Capture of Maryam-uz-Zamānī's Ship: Mughal Women and European Traders". Journal of the American Oriental Society. 108 (2). American Oriental Society: 227–238. doi:10.2307/603650. JSTOR 603650.
- Millward, James A. (2007), Eurasian crossroads: a history of Xinjiang, Columbia University Press, p. 86, ISBN 978-0-231-13924-3
- Trigault, Nicolas S. J. "China in the Sixteenth Century: The Journals of Mathew Ricci: 1583-1610". English translation by Louis J. Gallagher, S.J. (New York: Random House, Inc. 1953). This is an English translation of the Latin work, De Christiana expeditione apud Sinas based on Matteo Ricci's journals completed by Nicolas Trigault. In particular, Book Five, Chapter 11, "Cathay and China: The Extraordinary Odyssey of a Jesuit Lay Brother" and Chapter 12, "Cathay and China Proved to Be Identical." (pp. 499–521 in 1953 edition). There is also full Latin text available on Google Books.
- "The Journey of Benedict Goës from Agra to Cathay" – Henry Yule's translation of the relevant chapters of De Christiana expeditione apud Sinas, with detailed notes and an introduction. In: Yule, Sir Henry, ed. (1866). Cathay and the way thither: being a collection of medieval notices of China. Issue 37 of Works issued by the Hakluyt Society. Printed for the Hakluyt society. pp. 529–596.
- The report of a Mahometan Merchant which had beene in Cambalu: and the troublesome travell of Benedictus Goes, a Portugall Jesuite, from Lahor to China by land, thorow the Tartars Countreyes, A.D. 1598, in Purchas his Pilgrimes, Volume XII (1625), p. 222. The book is available in a variety of formats on archive.org, including OCR-ed text. The book also appears on Internet Archive, but only in snippet view.
