= Philippe Couplet =

Flemish Jesuit missionary (1623–1693)

Chinese name
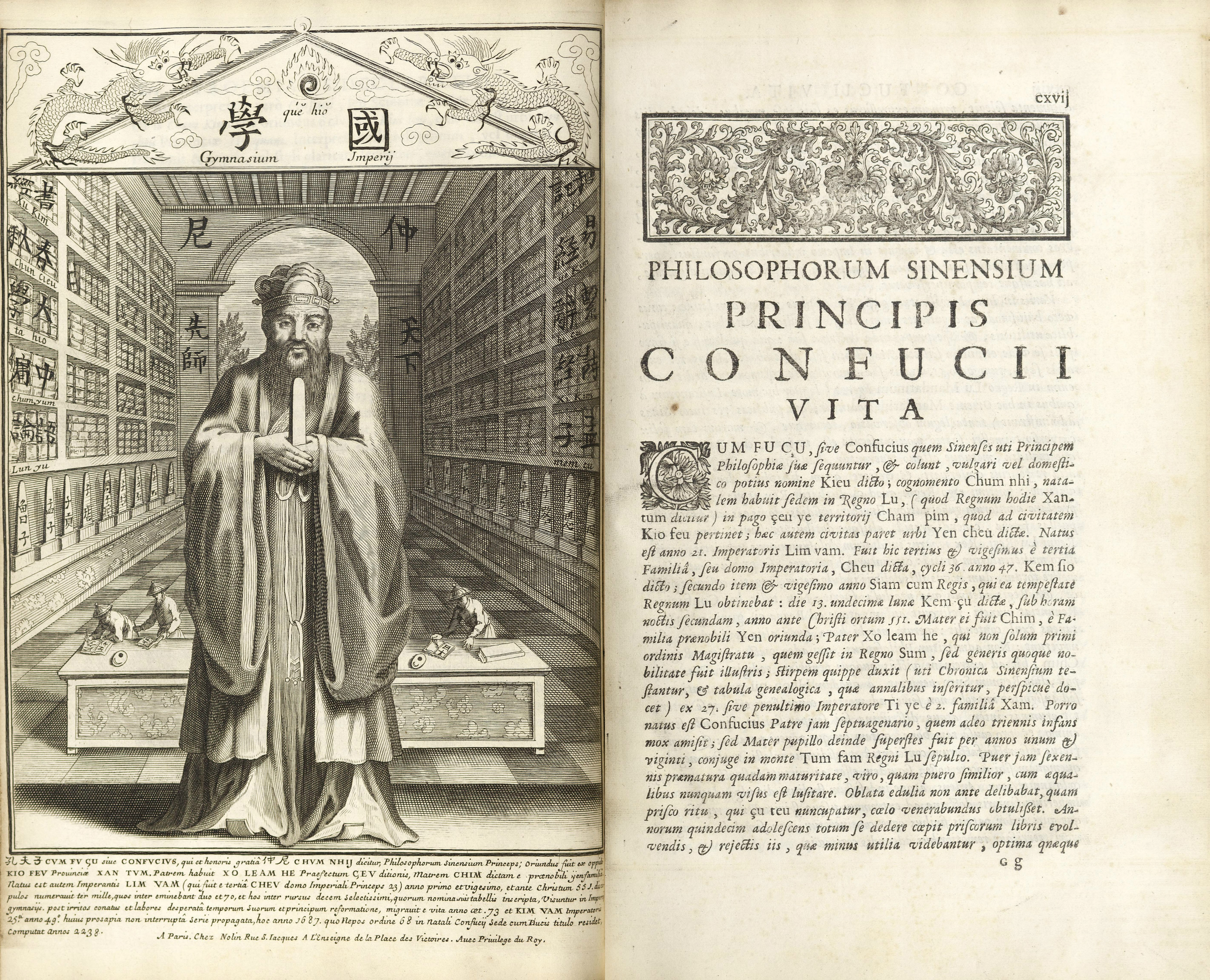
- Confucius, Philosopher of the Chinese, or, Chinese Knowledge Explained in Latin (1687), produced by a team of Jesuits led by Philippe Couplet.

Bai Yingli
- Traditional Chinese: 柏應理
- Simplified Chinese: 柏应理
Transcriptions
Standard Mandarin
- Hanyu Pinyin: Bǎi Yìnglǐ
- Wade–Giles: Pai Ying-li

Philippe Couplet, SJ (1623–1693), known in China as Bai Yingli, was a Flemish Jesuit missionary to the Qing Empire. He worked with his fellow missionaries to compile the influential Confucius, Philosopher of the Chinese, published in Paris in 1687. As his works were in Latin, he is also sometimes known as Philippus Couplet.

== Life ==
=== Early life ===
Philippe Couplet was born in Mechelen in the Spanish Netherlands (now Belgium) in 1623. He entered the Jesuit Order in 1640.

=== In China (1656–1681) ===
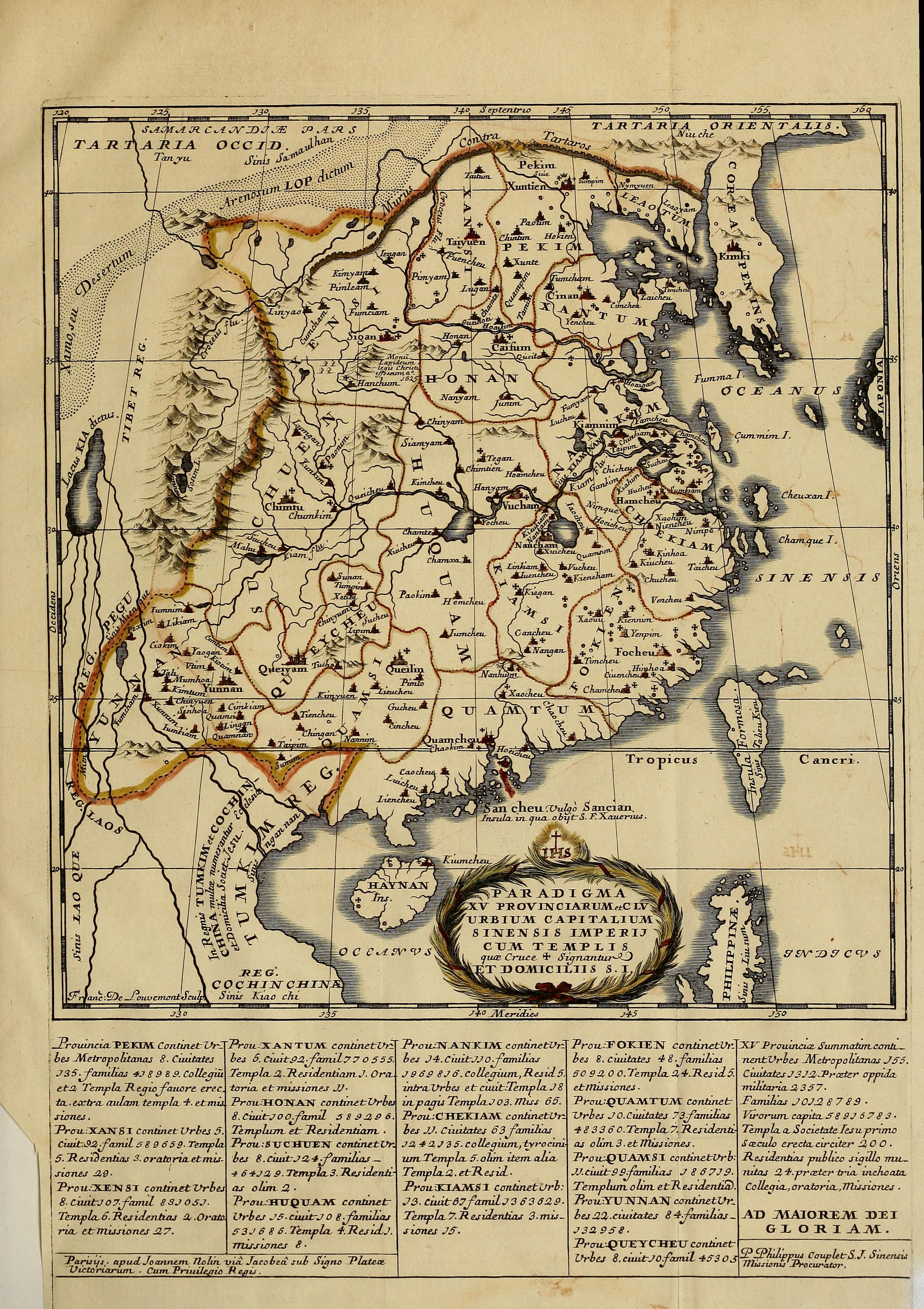
The map of China in the Confucius Sinarum Philosophus, with Couplet's notes about Chinese demographics.

Couplet's interest in China was aroused by a lecture by Martino Martini, a former Jesuit missionary there. Couplet initially left for China in 1656, in a group of new Jesuit recruits led by Michał Boym, who was returning to China with the Pope's response to the Southern Ming's Yongli Emperor plea for help. Couplet took various responsibilities throughout China, but had to take refuge in Canton during the 1665–1670 persecutions.

Couplet worked closely with Candida Xu (Chinese: 徐甘第大, Xu Gandida; 1607–1680), a granddaughter of Xu Guangqi and a devout Christian herself. Under her patronage, he was able to establish a number of new churches throughout Jiangnan.

=== In Europe (1681–1693) ===
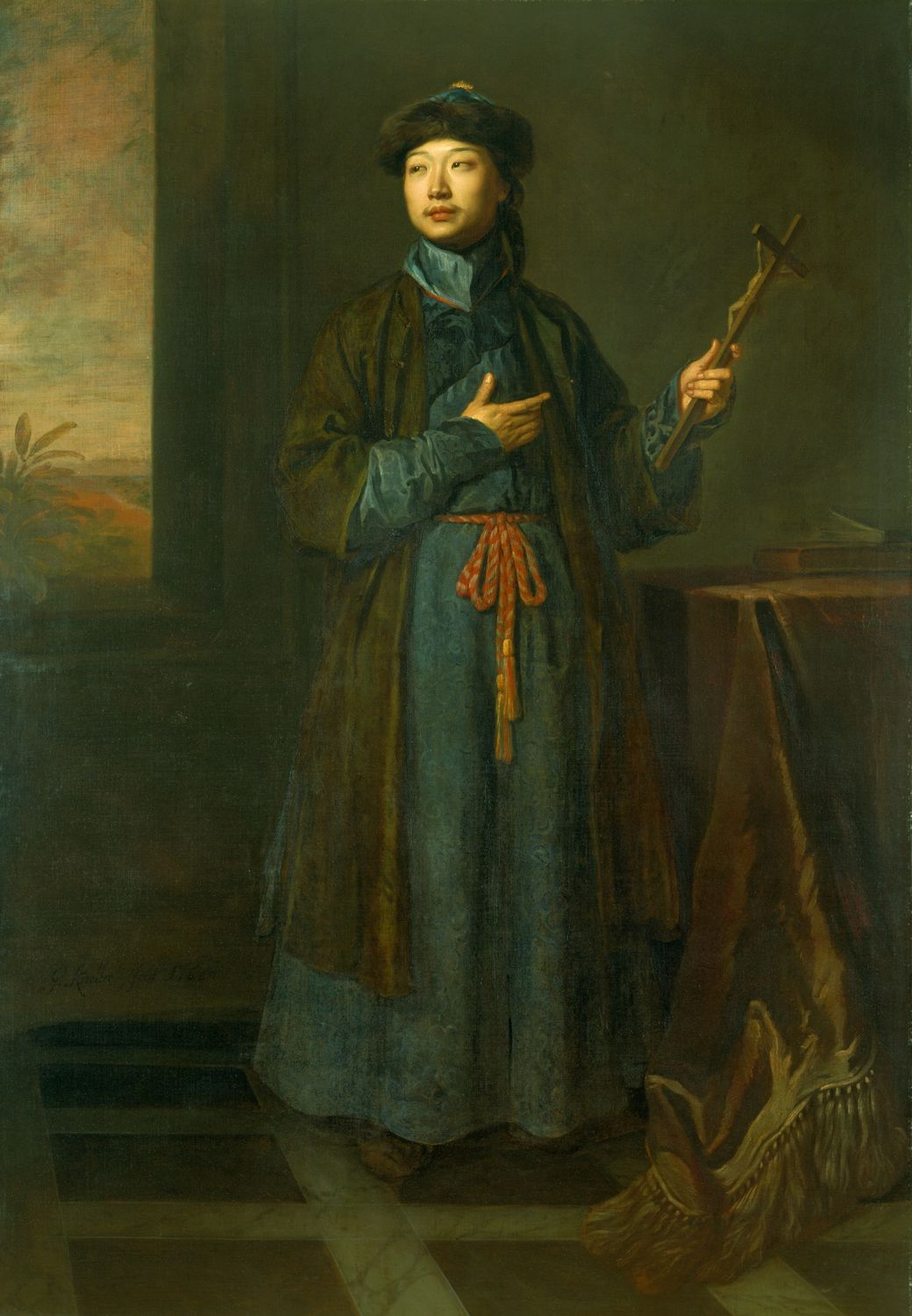
Philippe Couplet brought with him one of the first known Chinese men to visit Europe: Michael Shen (Shen Fuzong).

Couplet was sent back to Europe in 1681 as Procurator of the China Jesuits in Rome. His mission was to obtain papal agreement for the liturgy to be sung in Chinese. On his visit to the Papal States, he gave the Pope a library of Chinese translations of Christian books. While in Europe, his visit to Louis XIV triggered plans for the dispatch of five Jesuit mathematicians to the Chinese Court.

Upon his return to Europe in 1685 Couplet brought with him two Chinese converts, including Michael Shen (Shen Fuzong), one of the first Chinese men known to visit Europe; they saw Italy, France, and England. Soon after, Couplet and Shen answered questions about the nature of the Chinese language posed by linguists in Oxford, Berlin, and Vienna.

In 1686 Couplet published in Paris Tabula chronologica monarchiae sinicae, a "chronological table of the Chinese monarchy", in an attempt to show that there was agreement between the Septuagint and the Chinese chronological records. To prove his point he had to add 1400 years to the time period that existed between Creation and the birth of Abraham. This however did not satisfy the European intelligentsia or the missionaries in China. His work nevertheless had a major impact in other areas of European science. Leibniz, for example, was able to establish, after communicating with the Jesuits, that the binary system he had invented also existed in the Yijing.

In 1687, leading Prospero Intorcetta, Christian Wolfgang Herdtrich, and François de Rougemont, Couplet published Confucius Sinarum Philosophus ("Confucius, Philosopher of the Chinese"), an annotated translation of three out of the Four Books of the Confucian canon. The work—parts of which had appeared earlier in separate, little known, editions—built upon the efforts of several generations of Jesuit missionaries and was dedicated to Louis XIV. The preface to the translation highly praised the works of Confucius:

"One might say that the moral system of this philosopher is infinitely sublime, but that it is at the same time simple, sensible, and drawn from the purest sources of natural reason... Never has Reason, deprived of Divine Revelation, appeared so well developed nor with so much power."

— Preface to Confucius Sinarum Philosophus.

Although wanting to return to China, he had to wait until a dispute between the vicars apostolic of the Asian missions (to which he had taken an oath of obedience) and the Portuguese padroado system (his initial tutelary organization) was resolved. After an agreement was reached eight years later, Couplet finally left for China. As he was en route, however, a heavy chest fell on his head during a storm in the Arabian Sea, severely injuring the septuagenarian Jesuit. He died the next day, 16 May 1693, as his ship was about to reach Goa.

== Works ==
- Tabula Chronologica Monarchiae Sinicae [A Chronological Table of the Chinese Monarchy], 1686. (in Latin)
- Breve Raguaglio delle Cose piu Notabili Spettanti al Grand'Imperio della Cina (1687) (in Italian)
- Confucius Sinarum Philosophus, sive, Scientia Sinensis Latine Exposita [Confucius, Philosopher of the Chinese, or, Chinese Knowledge Explained in Latin], Paris: Daniel Horthemels, 1687. (in Latin)
- Histoire d'une dame chrétienne de la Chine où par occasion les usages de ces peuples, l'établissement de la religion, les manieres des missionaires, & les exercices de pieté des nouveaux chrétiens sont expliquez (Paris, 1688). Biography of Candida Xu.Free Online Digital Version Staatsbibliotek zu Berlin (in French)

== See also ==
- Jesuit China missions
