= Cornelius Wessels =

Dutch Jesuit writer

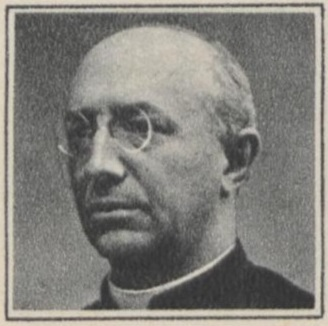
Cornelius Wessels

Cornelius Nicolaas Petrus Wessels (September 8, 1880 in Helmond, Netherlands – February 2, 1964 in Maastricht, Netherlands) was a Dutch Jesuit, known for his historical works on the early Catholic Missions in Central Asia, specially Tibet, and in the East Indies.

His main work, Early Jesuit travellers in Central Asia, 1603-1721, first published in 1924, was notable for its thoroughness and the exhaustiveness of the documentation referred to; and thus was seminal in the knowledge of the activities and travels of Bento de Góis, António de Andrade, Francisco de Azevedo, Estêvão Cacella, Johann Grueber, Albert d'Orville and Ippolito Desideri. The book includes a comprehensive map of such travels by the Dutch cartographer C. Craandijk.

== Works ==
- Wessels, C. (1924). Early Jesuit travellers in Central Asia, 1603-1721. Asian Educational Services. pp. 1–42. ISBN 81-206-0741-4. (First edition: 1924 - Early Jesuit travellers in Central Asia (1603-1721), Den Haag: Martinus Nijhoff.)
- De geschiedenis der R.K.Missie in Amboina,1546-1605. Nijmegen, 1926
- Catalogus Patrum et Fratrum e Societate Iesu qui in Missione Moluccana ab a. 1546 ad a. 1677 adlaboraverunt, in Archivum Historicum Societatis Iesu, Rome, Vol. I, 1932.
- 1911 - Bento de Goës S.J. Een ontdekkingsreiziger in Centraal-Azië (1603-1607), dans Studiën: Tijdschrift voor godsdienst, wetenschap en letteren
- 1912 - Antonio de Andrade, een ontdekkingsreiziger in de Himalaya en Tibet, dans Studiën: Tijdschrift voor godsdienst, wetenschap en letteren
- 1919 - Ierland: Economisch-geographische schetsen, dans Tijdschrift voor economische geographie
- 1926 - De geschiedenis der r.k. missie in Amboina:vanaf haar stichting door den H. Franciscus Xaverius tot haar vernietiging door de O.I. Compagnie, Den Haag: Koninklijke Bibliotheek.
- 1928 - Eenendertig hoofdstukken uit het verloren gegane livro IX van Lopes de Catanheda's Historio do descobrimentos e conquista sa India pelos portugues, dans Historisch Tijdschrift
- 1929 - De katholieke missie in het sultanaat Batjan (Molukken): 1556-1609, in Historisch Tijdschrift
- 1930 - Palestina in woord en beeld; (naar oorspronkelijke schilderijen van L.Blum te Jeruzalem en Henri Sicking te Breda), Groningen: Wolters
- 1930 - De eerste Franciscaner-missie op Java (1584-1599), dans Studiën: Tijdschrift voor godsdienst, wetenschap en letteren.
- 1932 - Introduction and notes to An account of Tibet: The travels of Ippolito Desideri, 1712-1727, London, George Routledge & Sons.
- 1933 - De katholieke missie in Noord-Celebes en op de Sangi-eilanden (1563-1605), 's-Hertogenbosch: Malmberg.
- 1933 - P. Aegidius de Abreu S.J. : een geloofsgetuige te Batavia, 's-Hertogenbosch: Malmberg.
- 1933 - Eenige aanteekeningen betreffende het bisdom en de bisschoppen van Malaka (1558- 1838), in Historisch Tijdschrift.
- 1934 - De Augustijnen in de Molukken (1544-1546), (1606-1625) Tilburg: Bergmans.
- 1935 - De katholieke missie in de Molukken, Noord-Celebes en de Sangihe-eilanden tijdens de Spaansche bestuursperiode, (1606-1677), in Historisch Tijdschrift.
- 1936 - De Theatijnen op Borneo en Sumatra, 1688- 1764, in Historisch Tijdschrift.
- 1938-'40 - Geschiedenis van Nederlandsch Indië (onder redactie van Frederik Willem Stapel), Amsterdam, Uitgeversmaatsch. Joost van den Vondel
- 1939 - Uit de missiegeschiedenis van Sumatra, Atjeh in de 16e en 17e eeuw, in Historisch Tijdschrift.
- 1940 - New documents relating to the journey of Fr. John Grueber, in Archivum Historicum Societatis Iesu.

== See also ==
- Catholic Church in Tibet
- Jesuit China missions
- History of European exploration in Tibet
