= Prospero Intorcetta =

Italian Jesuit missionary (1625–1696)

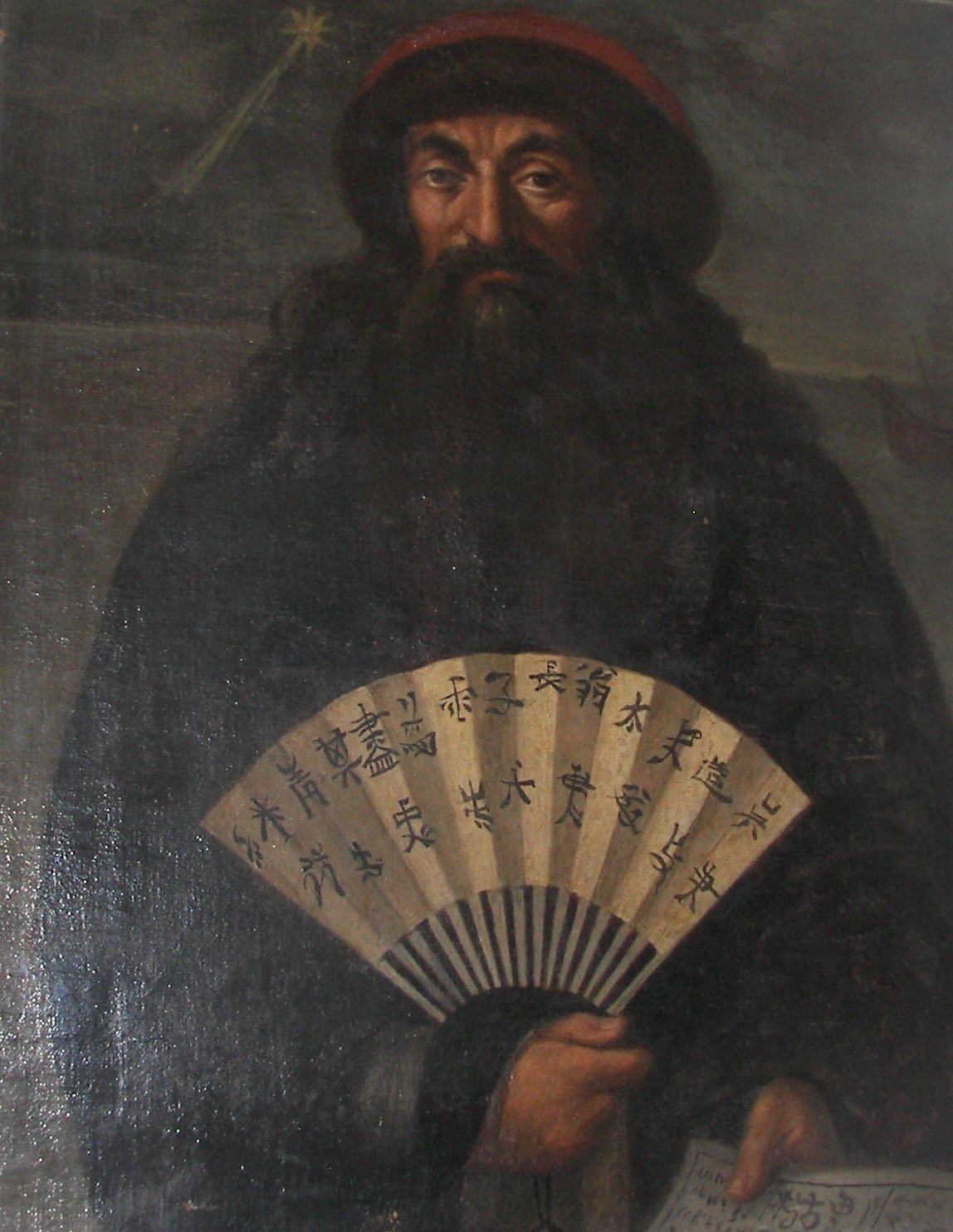
- Prospero Intorcetta in 1671
- Traditional Chinese: 殷鐸澤
- Simplified Chinese: 殷铎泽
Transcriptions
Standard Mandarin
- Hanyu Pinyin: Yīn Duózé
- Wade–Giles: Yin To-tsê

Prospero Intorcetta (1625–1696), known to the Chinese as Yin Duoze, was an Italian Jesuit missionary to the Qing Empire. He was the first to translate the works of Confucius in Europe.

== Life ==
Prospero Intorcetta was born in Piazza Armerina, Sicily, on August 28, 1625.He joined the Jesuit order in 1642.

Traveling with the Flemish Jesuit Philippe Couplet, he reached China in 1659. There, he mostly worked in the Jiangnan region around the lower Yangtze River.

In 1665, he was exiled to Canton with 25 other missionaries; he returned to Rome in 1669 and travelled back to Hangzhou in 1676.

He died on October 3, 1696. He is buried in Hangzhou.

== Works ==
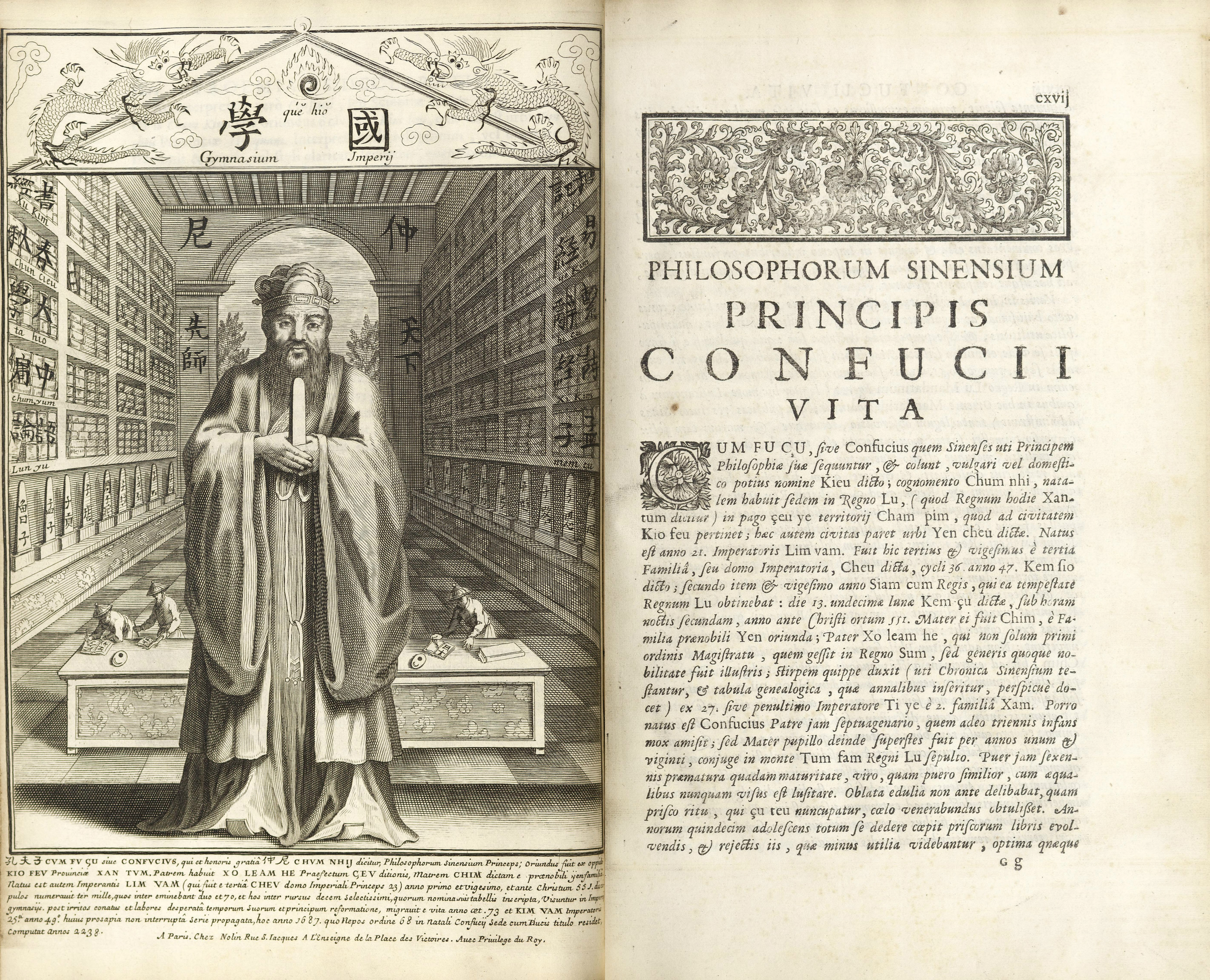
Confucius, Philosopher of the Chinese (1687).

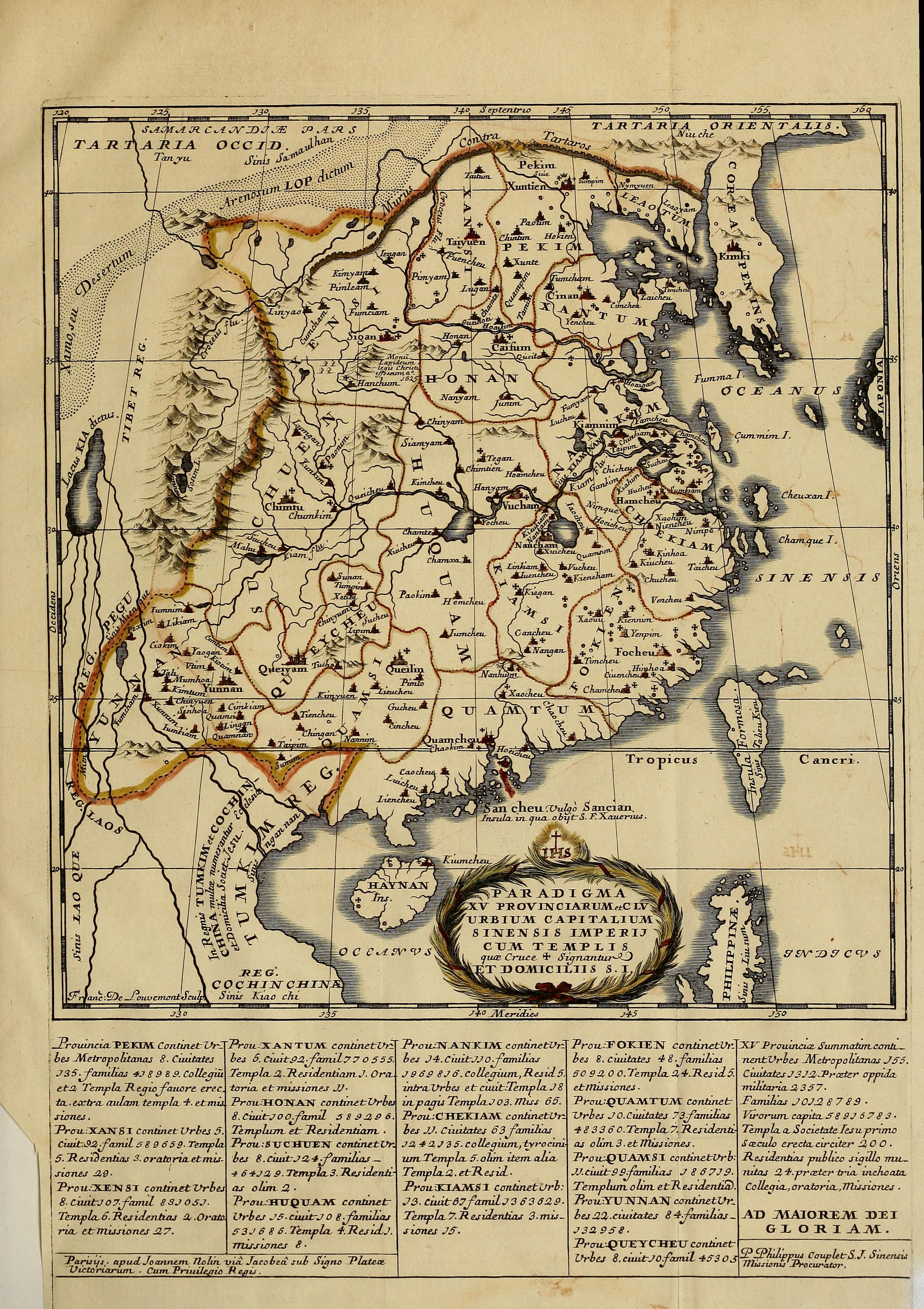
The map of China in the 3rd book of the Confucius.

Intorcetta studied Chinese philosophy. In 1662, he published the study of the Four Books of Confucianism in a Latin work entitled The Meaning of Chinese Wisdom. In 1667, he published the Politico-Moral Knowledge of the Chinese (Sinarum Scientia Politico-moralis). In 1687, under Philippe Couplet's guidance, he worked with Christian Wolfgang Herdtrich and François de Rougemont to compile an influential Latin overview of Chinese history and translation of some of the Confucian classics under the title Confucius, Philosopher of the Chinese (Confucius Sinarum Philosophus) which was published in Paris.

== See also ==
- Jesuit missions in China
- Chinese Rites controversy
