= François de Rougemont =

François de Rougemont (1624–1676) was a Jesuit missionary, historian and translator in Qing China.

== Life ==
De Rougemont was born in Maastricht on 2 April 1624. In 1635 he was sent to the Jesuit college in Antwerp for his secondary education, transferring to the Brussels college in 1639. As a student he stood out for his command of Latin and his theatrical flair. In 1641, aged 17, he entered the Jesuit noviciate in Mechelen. As a novice, he studied philosophy in Leuven (1643–1645). In 1645 he was sent to the Jesuit house in Kortrijk, where he was among those tending to the wounded during and after the Siege of Kortrijk (1646). From 1646 to 1650 he taught at the Jesuit college in Ypres, and from 1650 to 1652 in Brussels. He then returned to Leuven for theological studies (1652–1654). In 1654, Rougemont applied to accompany Martino Martini on the latter's return to the Jesuit missions in China. He was ordained priest in Brussels by Jacobus Torrentius on 25 November 1654, celebrating his first mass in Leuven on 2 December.

=== Journey to China ===
Together with Philippe Couplet, Rougemont travelled from Antwerp to Amsterdam in the winter of 1654-1655. They spent some months in the city before taking ship for Lisbon in March 1655, arriving on 10 April, after the annual fleet to the Far East had already sailed. Rougemont was sent to Coimbra for further study and to learn Portuguese, while Couplet remained in Lisbon as chaplain to the Flemish merchants there. They finally departed for the Far East in March 1656, in the company of the veteran missionary Michael Boym, arriving in Goa in November 1656 and immediately visiting the tomb of Francis Xavier. After some months in Goa, not being able to take ship for Macau, they travelled overland to Nagapattinam and took ship to Siam, arriving there in October 1657 and remaining there until June 1658. Couplet and Rougemont each travelled on separate Portuguese ships from Siam to Macau, where Rougemont arrived in late July 1658.

=== Missionary in China ===
In Macau, Rougemont began studying Chinese at St. Paul's College, and in February 1659 he made his final vows, including the Fourth Vow of missionary obedience to the Pope. In March, he and Couplet set off for mainland China with Martini and the Italian newcomer Prospero Intorcetta, arriving in Hangzhou in June 1659. Rougemont spent another year studying Chinese there.

Rougemont worked in Shanghai 1660–1661, then in Jiangsu, where he was based in Changzhou, and from 1662 ran the mission, overseeing 14 churches and 22 mission stations. The government in 1664 having ordered a clampdown on Christian missionaries, Rougemont was arrested in February 1665 and sent to Beijing, where he arrived in January 1666 and a few weeks later was sentenced to exile in Guangzhou. He remained there until 1671. He was then permitted to resume his missionary activity, and died in Changzhou in early November 1676. An accounts book from his final years, running from October 1674 to March 1676, has been preserved and was published with detailed commentary by Noël Golvers in 1999.

== Writings ==
During his imprisonment in Guangzhou, Rougemont wrote Historia tartaro-sinica nova, covering events of the years 1660–1667, during the end and aftermath of the conflict between the native Yongli Emperor and the conquering Qing dynasty. The manuscript was sent to Europe, where it was first printed in Lisbon in 1672, in the Portuguese translation of Sebastião de Magalhães, and only the following year in Leuven in the original Latin.

He also contributed to Philippe Couplet's edition of a Latin translation of Confucian classics, and compiled a number of doctrinal or catechetical works in Chinese, including Innocentia Victrix, a Latin–Chinese parallel text printed with woodblocks in Guangzhou in 1670.
