= Isabel Reigota =

17th-century Portuguese trader in Macau

Isabel Reigota (died 1697) was a Portuguese trader who was born in Japan and lived in Macau in the 17th century. She took over her husband's business after being widowed, and played a notable role in establishing Macau's trade in sandalwood, as well as in funding religious missions by Jesuits in Japan and Macau. She was involved in a notable dispute with several Jesuit leaders over a sandalwood transaction in the 1650s, which was ultimately resolved in her favor.

== About ==
Reigota was born either in Nagasaki, Japan, or in Macau. Her father was Diogo Fernandes Reigoto, a Portuguese trader, and her mother, Maria, was Japanese. She lived in Japan, and probably spoke Japanese, as well as being fluent in Portuguese. Her father married her to a Portuguese trader based in Macau, named Francisco Rombo de Carvalho, and they left Japan for Macau following religious persecution. Together, they supported Jesuit missions in South-east and East Asia, donating money to fund missions to China, Vietnam, and Cambodia, and Reigota herself funded a Jesuit residence in China.

In 1640, Reigota's husband died, and she took over his business. According to Portuguese custom in Macau, as a widow she was confined to her home, where she raised, in addition to her son, two nieces of a Jesuit priest that she had rescued from poverty, and a nephew, whom she supported through education in the seminary before he joined the Society of Jesus. Following the death of her husband, Reigota became a significant trader in sandalwood, helping to establish the sandalwood trade between Timor and Macau. In 1651, Reigota became involved in a notable dispute with the Jesuit Manuel de Figueiredo, who was at that time the prosecutor of the vice-province of China, over a transaction concerning import of sandalwood, when the agent she had appointed to act as her intermediary suddenly died, leaving her unable to fulfill her obligations to the buyer, and being accused by Figueiredo of dishonesty in turn. Records of correspondence between Reigota and Jesuit officials show that the conflict was ultimately resolved several years later in her favor. This 'sandalwood conflict' was widely known during her lifetime, and was discussed in several documentary sources.

She died on 21 January 1697 and was buried in St. Paul's Church in Macau. She had one son, Manuel, who lived in Macau.
