= Jacques Gernet =

French sinologist (1921–2018)

Jacques Gernet (French: [ʒɛʁnɛ]; Chinese: 謝和耐; pinyin: Xiè Hénài; 22 December 1921, Algiers, French Algeria – 3 March 2018, Vannes) was an eminent French sinologist of the second half of the 20th century. His best-known work is The Chinese Civilization, a 900-page summary of Chinese history and civilization which has been translated into many languages.

== Biography ==
Jacques was the son of Louis Gernet (1882–1962).

Gernet obtained a degree in classics at the University of Algiers in 1942. He then served in World War II from 1942 to 1945. After the war, he started to study the Chinese language. In 1947, he received his degree in Chinese from the National School of Oriental Languages and, in 1948, from the École pratique des hautes études (EPHE). He then became a member of the French School of the Far East, before being a researcher at CNRS and Scholar of the Yomiuri Shimbun in Japan. He received his Doctor of Letters in 1956.

From 1955 to 1976, Gernet served as director of studies at the EPHE, VIe section, then at the École des hautes études en sciences sociales. He taught Chinese language and culture at the Faculty of Arts of the Sorbonne in 1957, first as a lecturer, then as professor starting in 1959. In 1968, he founded the Unit of teaching and research of languages and civilizations of East Asia (University of Paris-VII), and was its director until 1973. He entered the Collège de France, where he was chair in social and intellectual history of China from 1975 to 1992.

For Rolf Stein, Gernet was "the only French sinologist who truly studied all aspects of Chinese civilization and who dominated it entirely".

Gernet died in Vannes on 3 March 2018.

== Distinctions ==
- 1979: Member of the Académie des Inscriptions et Belles-Lettres
- Chevalier of the Legion of Honour
- Commander of the Ordre des Palmes académiques

== Publications ==
- 1949 : Entretiens du maître de dhyâna Chen-houei du Ho-tsö (668-760), Hanoi, EFEO (PEFEO, 31).
- 1956 : Les Aspects économiques du bouddhisme dans la société chinoise du Ve au Xe siècle, Saigon, EFEO (PEFEO, 39). †
- 1959 : La Vie quotidienne en Chine à la veille de l'invasion mongole, Paris, Hachette. †
- 1970 : Catalogue des manuscrits chinois de la Bibliothèque nationale, fonds Pelliot de Touen-houang, vol. 1, Paris, Bibliothèque nationale. With Wu Chi-yü.
- 1972 : Le Monde chinois, Paris, A. Colin. † Translated as A History of Chinese Civilization, Cambridge: Cambridge University Press, 1995. (2nd ed.) (English translation)
- 1982 : Chine et christianisme, action et réaction, Paris, Gallimard. †
- 1991 : Tang Zhen, Écrits d'un sage encore inconnu, Paris, Gallimard.
- 1994 : L'Intelligence de la Chine : le social et le mental, Paris, Gallimard.
- 2005 : La Raison des choses: Essai sur la philosophie de Wang Fuzhi (1619–1692), Paris, Gallimard.

† Translated into English.
