= Sampson (crater) =

Crater on the Moon

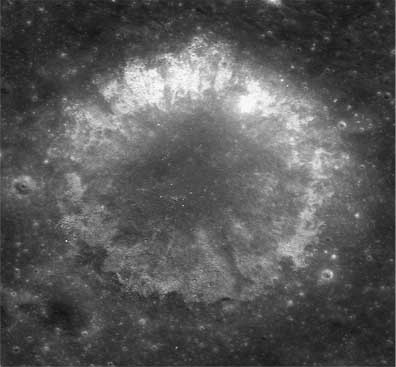
- LRO image
- Coordinates: 29.7°N 16.5°W
- Diameter: 1.5 km
- Depth: Unknown
- Colongitude: 17° at sunrise
- Eponym: Ralph Allan Sampson

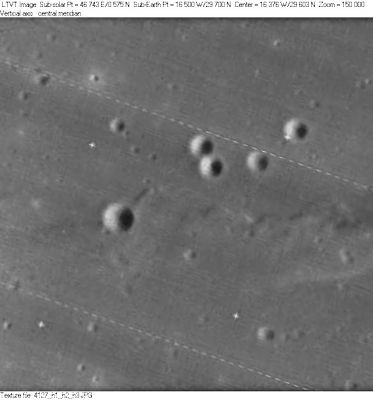
Lunar Orbiter 4 image showing Sampson left of center with four other small, unnamed craters of similar size.

Sampson is a relatively tiny lunar impact crater located near the central part of the Mare Imbrium. It was named after British astronomer Ralph Allan Sampson. To the northeast is the crater Landsteiner and to the southeast lies Timocharis. East of this crater is the Dorsum Grabau, a wrinkle ridge in the mare.

== See also ==
- Asteroid 9881 Sampson
