= Dominique Parrenin =

French Jesuit missionary to China (1665-1741)

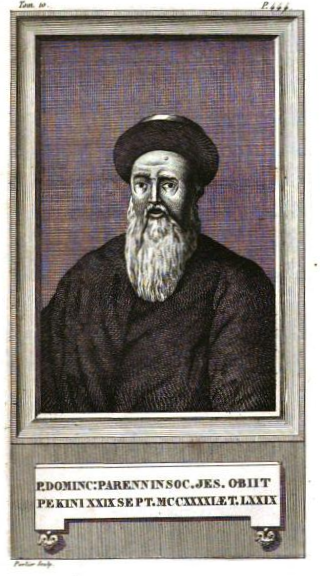
Dominique Parrenin

Dominique Parrenin or Parennin (Chinese: 巴多明) (1 September 1665, at le Russey, near Besançon – 29 September 1741, at Beijing) was a French Jesuit missionary to China.

== Life ==
Parrenin entered the Jesuit order on 1 September 1685. In 1697, he was sent to China. When he was in Beijing in 1698, he attracted the attention of the Kangxi Emperor of the Qing dynasty. His varied knowledge, and familiar use of the court languages, Chinese and Manchu, gained him the good will of the emperor. Parrenin used this favour in the interest of religion and science.

While satisfying the curiosity of the Kangxi Emperor, especially about physics, medicine, and the history of Europe, he argued that the scientific culture of the West was due to Christianity. Obliged to travel with the emperor, he visited Chinese Christians.

He was involved in the Kangxi mapping project carried out by the Jesuits, including Antoine Thomas, Xavier Ehrenbert Fridelli, Jean-Baptiste Régis, Joachim Bouvet and others.

Well liked by important personages at the court and the highest dignitaries of the Qing Empire, he led them to look with favour on the spreading of Christianity. In the Lettres édifiantes, he has written on the admirable example set by the princes of the Sounou family, whose conversion, begun by Father Suarez, he completed.

The Yongzheng Emperor, who succeeded the Kangxi Emperor, soon made known his aversion for Christianity, and only his consideration for the missionaries at Beijing, principally for Parrenin, protected Christianity in China. This emperor respected the missionaries, not for their scientific knowledge, but for their character and virtues. He demanded services of more tangible importance, notably at audiences granted to the ambassadors of Russia and Portugal during the long negotiations, both commercial and political, with the former of the two powers. The Chinese ministers needed the missionaries, not only as conscientious and trusty interpreters, but men capable of informing them on European matters and of inspiring confidence.

Parrenin was assisted by his confrères, Anne-Marie de Mailla and Antoine Gaubil. The mission at Beijing continued to exist among persecutions, and the toleration shown to it helped Christians in the provinces. He was caught up in the rites controversy; but was misrepresented in the "Mémoires historiques du Cardinal de Tournon" and the "Anecdotes sur l'Etat de la Religion dans la Chine". He had sent specimens of the caterpillar fungus (Ophiocordyceps sinensis) to France.

== Other ==
Parrenin translated into Manchu for the Kangxi Emperor several of the works published in the Mémoires de l'Académie des Sciences at Paris. In 1723, d'Ortous de Mairan, of the Académie des Sciences, and Fréret, perpetual secretary of the Académie des Inscriptions, sent him their "doubts" about the history, chronology, and astronomy of the Chinese. His answers led to other questions, and this scientific correspondence continued until 1740.

=== Publications ===
His publications included;

- Discours prononcé au Russey, le 17 mai 1864
- Les Héros Chrétiens, Ou Lettres Sur Une Famille de Princes Tartares

== Sources ==
- Lettres édifiantes et curieuses. 26e Recueil. Préface et Lettre du P. Chalier (Paris, 1753);
- Lettre du P. Antoine Gaubil on the death of P. Parrenin, MS. 12223 in the Bibliothèque Nationale, with the letters of Parrenin to Mairan and Fréret (1729–60), unedited;
- Lettres de M. de Mairan au R. P. Parrenin, contenant diverses questions sur la Chine (Paris, 1759–70);
- Brucker, Le mission de Chine de 1722 à 1735 in Revue des questions historiques, XXIX, 491 (January 1881);
- ____, Correspondence scientifique du missionaire francais à Peking au XVIIIe Siécle in Revue du monde catholique. XXVI, 701, (1883);
- Augustin de Backer & Carlos Sommervogel, Bibliothèque des écrivains de la C. de J. VI, 284-290, IX, 757;
- Cordier, Bibliotheca Sinica.
