= Jean-Baptiste Régis =

French Jesuit missionary

Jean-Baptiste Régis (11 June 1663 or 29 January 1664 – 24 November 1738) was a French Jesuit missionary and geographer in imperial China.

== Biography and works ==
Régis was born at Istres, in Provence. He was received into the Society of Jesus on 14 September 1683, or 13 September 1679. He went to China in 1698 and served there for 40 years. He was heavily involved in the making of the general map of the Chinese Empire. He died in Beijing.

=== Cartography ===
The early Jesuit missionaries had already endeavoured to make known to Europe the true geography of China, of which at the end of the 16th century even the best cartographers were utterly ignorant. Their achievements up to the middle of the 17th century are summed up in the Novus Atlas Sinensis published by Martin Martini (Amsterdam, 1655). He was greatly assisted in this work by Chinese books of geography, where he found a mass of descriptive information, the distances between important places, and even maps which however were very crude, the distances having been measured with little exactitude. These imperfect data he supplemented and completed by astronomical observations made in the chief towns by himself and his associates; hence the positions of his Atlas are remarkably accurate. The favour enjoyed by the missionaries with the Kangxi Emperor (1662–1722) made it possible for them to improve on this. Ferdinand Verbiest collected the earliest ideas of "Tatary" (i.e. the Mongol Empire) during two journeys made to that country with the emperor (1682–1683).

The arrival in China in 1687 of French Jesuits sent by Louis XIV gave new impetus to scholarly labours in the mission, especially to geography. Provided with perfected instruments and trained in the methods of the astronomers of the observatory of Paris, the new missionaries were able to determine more correctly locations already calculated. The Mémoires and the Histoire de l'Académie des Sciences record their observations. Jean-François Gerbillion made eight journeys through Tatary and Mongolia (1688–98) acquiring more geographical information concerning them. In 1701 the great work of the general map of the empire, begun by the topographical drawing of the capital city of Beijing and its environs, including the ancient summer residences of the emperors and 1700 towns or villages, was assigned to Antoine Thomas, a Belgian of Namur, and three Frenchmen, Joachim Bouvet, Jean Baptiste Régis and Dominique Parrenin. Qing Emperor Kangxi, who wished to take measures against the periodic overflow of the rivers of Zhili, was satisfied.

Parennin then induced him to consent to a map of the Great Wall of China. Bouvet, Régis and Pierre Jartoux measured their route to the eastern extremity of the famous rampart by means of regularly divided cords, keeping track of directions with the assistance of a compass, and frequently observing the meridian of the sun in order to calculate latitudes. In four days they reached the Gulf of Zhili (8 June 1708) and began operations on the great Wall. On 16 October they estimated its extent to be 21° long., or almost half the widest breadth of the United States from east to west and had determined the positions of the fortified towns "by which it was flanked", according to Régis. At the end of two months, Bouvet, being ill, retired to Beijing. Régis and Jartoux reached the western edge of the Great Wall at Jiayuguan and completed their work by the mensuration of an interior lateral wall which had brought them to Xining, on the frontier of Tibet, near Lake Kukunor. They returned to Beijing on 10 January 1709. Their map pleased the Kangxi Emperor, who requested the continuation of the work for the provinces outside the Great Wall and for China proper.

Régis, Jartoux and Ernbert Fridelli, from the Austrian Tyrol, set out for the northeast. In two expeditions (8 May - 17 December 1709; 22 July - 14 December 1710) they made the map of Liaodong and Manchuria, and during the interval drew the province of Zhili, in which Beijing is situated. In 1711 the Portuguese priest Francis Cardoso, and the Augustinian Guillaume Bonjour, the only non-Jesuit, joined the geographers. Régis and Cardoso drew the map of Shandong; Jartoux, Fridelli and Bonjour traversed Mongolia as far as Lake Baikal in the north and the Zunghar Khanate to the west. The year 1712 brought a new reinforcement; Vincent de Tartre and Cardoso made the maps of Shanxi and Shaanxi (1712–14), Jiangxi and Guangdong, and Guangxi; Anne-Marie de Mailla, Roman Hinderer, an Alsatian, and Régis laboured (1712–15) on the maps of Hunan, Jiangnan, Zhejiang, Fujian and the Island of Formosa. Meanwhile, Fridelli and Bonjour were at Sichuan, where Bonjour died on 23 December 1714, and was replaced by Régis on 24 March 1715. He assisted Fridelli with the maps of Yunnan, Guizhou and Huguang. After ten years' labour the new map of China was completed on 1 January 1717. The fundamental method employed was the exact measurement of distances from which was obtained the longitude and latitude of places; this, supplemented and controlled by the observations of the meridians of the sun and the polar stars, directly gave the latitude. The missionaries were sometimes assisted by the observation of eclipses of the moon and the satellites of Jupiter, of which more perfect process they desired to make use to obtain longitudes, but conditions did not permit.

In reply to a criticism of Féret, the learned secretary of the Académie des Inscriptions et Belles-Lettres, Antoine Gaubil wrote (5 November 1736):

"When thinking of a map of China and Tatary, you had in mind such men as MM. Cassini, Maraldi, Chazelles and others who worked at the meridian assisted by all the necessary instruments and having plenty of time at their disposals. Our Fathers made use of the avocation of map-makers to do missionary work, to procure assistance and protection for the missionaries of the provinces, and to establish new missions. The Chinese and Tartar mandarins who accompanied them hindered them exceedingly; they had orders not to let the Fathers go where they would, ... and would never allow them sufficient time for observation of meridians, the measurement of roads, the variation of the needle (magnetic needle), the rhomb, and the estimation of positions from these elements. The work being finished the completed map had to be sent in haste to the emperor ... compared to what was done elsewhere for maps of countries smaller than China and Tartary this work can but do honour to the Tatar prince who commanded such a worthy undertaking and assuredly it did not discredit our Fathers."

Ferdinand de Richthofer, the geologist and explorer of China, wrote "If we consider the time at which it was made, the map of the Jesuits, as a whole, may be called a masterpiece" (China, I, 686).

=== Publications ===
Jartoux, who with Régis and Fridelli been most heavily involved in the work, sent a copy to France. It was published by Jean-Baptiste du Halde with the assistance of the celebrated geographer Jean Baptiste Bourguignon d'Anville in the Description de la Chine (1735). Régis composed a short commentary on it under the name of Nouvelle géographie de la Chine et de la Tartarie orientale, which is preserved in the Bibliothèque Nationale, Paris, fr. MS. 17, 242; Du Halde availed himself of the writing to a great extent but would have done better to publish it entire.

Régis also turned his attention to the ancient Chinese books. He was the first Westerner to translate the I-Ching. Gaubil praises his "sane criticism" on the subject, and the English sinologist James Legge writes: "Régis is known as the interpreter of the Yih-king. His work was edited at Stuttgart, in 1834, by Julius Mohl. One part of the first volume is occupied with Prolegomena which contain the most valuable introduction to the Chinese higher classics that has yet been published ("Notions of the Chinese concerning God and the spirits", 1852, 69).

Gaubil describes his great virtue as humility and modesty, and says: "He was universally esteemed and loved by the missionaries of various bodies, Christians and the people of the Court who associated with him".

== See also ==
- Jesuit missions in China
