= Jean Domenge =

French Jesuit in China

Jean Domenge (born 7 April 1666 in Bordeaux, France; died 9 December 1735 in Macau), Chinese name Meng Zhengqi 孟正气 / 孟正氣, was a French Catholic priest and missionary in China, belonging to the Society of Jesus.

Jean Domenge was born in Bordeaux. He arrived in China in 1698. His predecessor was the Italian Jesuit Giampaolo Gozani. Jean Domenge is particularly remembered for his attempts to verify the alleged presence of Jews in the city of Kaifeng in Henan province. He made detailed sketches of what was believed to be a Jewish synagogue there and described the synagogue service he had attended, including readings from the Books of Moses. The French Jesuit had visited Kaifeng twice and he had close contacts. He wrote six letters from 1721–25. He made drawings of the congregational Torah reading and the interior and exterior of the synagogue.

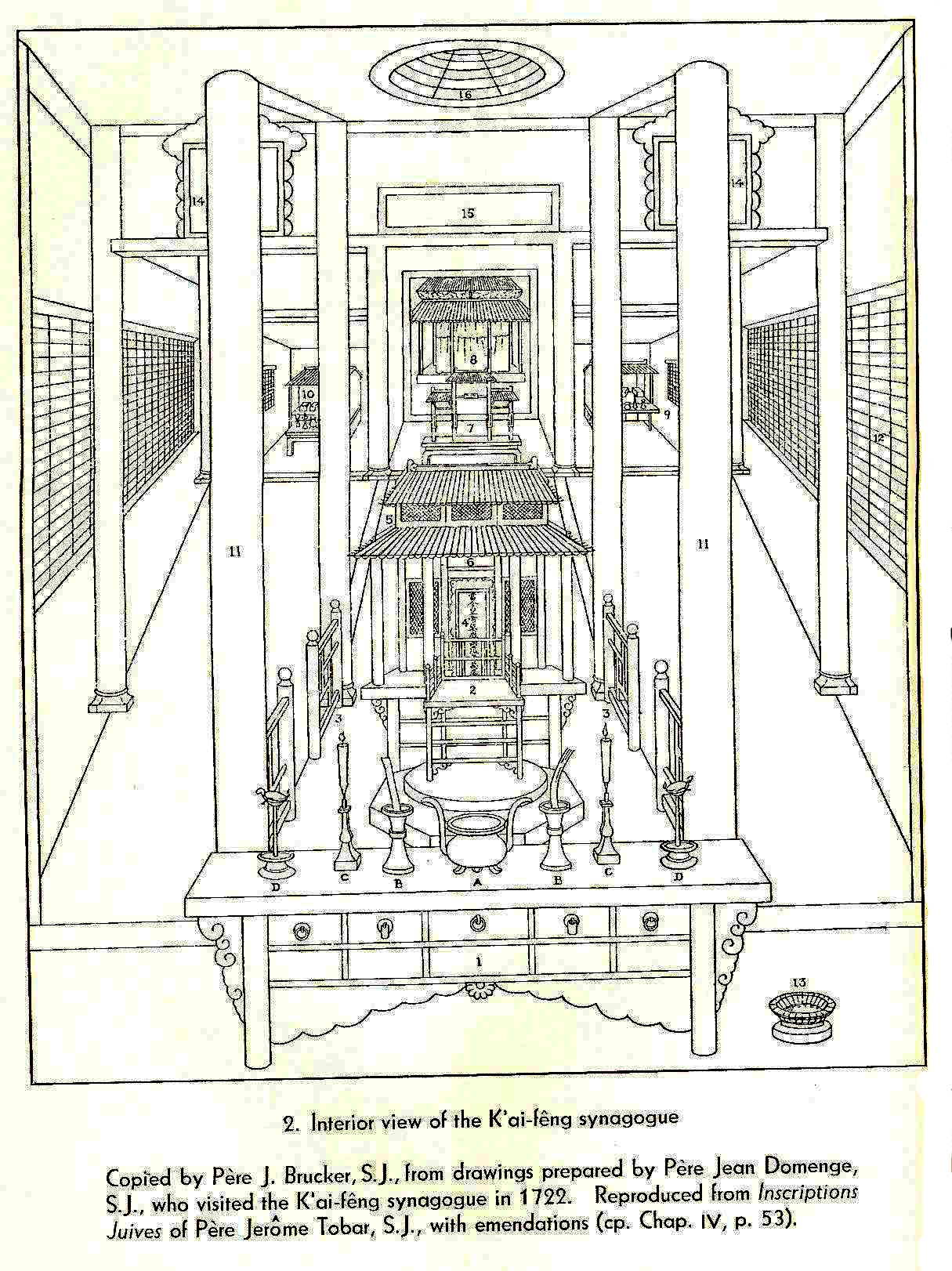
Illustration of the synagogue in Kaifeng, based on Father Domenge’s sketches

In 1722, he created and sent to Rome a series of detailed sketches of what was believed to be a Jewish synagogue near the city’s drum tower. He also described the synagogue service he had attended, noting the readings from the Books of Moses and that the calendar used for celebrating religious festivals followed Western Jewish models, even though it had been adapted to the Chinese calendar.

== See also ==
- List of Jesuit missionaries in China (in German)
- Lettres édifiantes et curieuses (in French)
- Antoine Gaubil (1689-1759), S.J.
- Étienne Souciet (1671-1744), S.J.

== Bibliography ==
- Rudolf Loewenthal: «An Imaginary Illustration of the Kaifeng Jewish Synagogue», in Oriens Extremus, Vol. 19, No. 1/2 (december 1972), Harrassowitz Verlag, pp. 95-98 (in partial view)
- Louis Pfister: Notices biographiques et bibliographiques sur les jésuites de l'ancienne mission de Chine, 1552-1773, Chang-hai, 1932-1934, pp. 498-500 (Nendeln: Kraus Reprint, 1971)
- Erik Zürcher: "Eight Centuries in the Chinese Diaspora: The Jews of Kaifeng", in: Anson H. Laytner and Jordan Paper (eds.): The Chinese Jews of Kaifeng: A Millennium of Adaptation and Endurance. 2017 (in partial view)
- Bibliothèque de la Compagnie de Jésus. 1890, III:126/7
- Pan Guang 潘光: Die Juden in China 犹太人在中国. China Intercontinental Press 2003 (partial view)
