= Records of Events in the Tangut Empire =

The Records of Events in the Tangut Empire (Chinese: 西夏書事; pinyin: Xīxià Shūshì; lit. 'Affairs of the Western Xia Dynasty') is a 42-juǎn history of the Western Xia dynasty compiled in the Qing dynasty by the historian Wu Guangcheng (吳廣成).

== Authorship and Compilation ==
Wú Guǎngchéng states in his preface that, unlike the Liao and Jin dynasties, Western Xia had no dedicated official history; after its fall, most of its records were lost or became unintelligible. To remedy the gaps left by the Book of Song, History of Liao, and History of Jin, he assembled this work from scattered sources.

Unfortunately, Wú Guǎngchéng does not indicate his concrete sources, making it difficult to ascertain the origin of numerous passages.

== Overview ==
The work is composed in the style of annalistic outline (Chinese: 綱目體; pinyin: gāngmù tǐ), modeled on Zhu Xi's famous Zizhi Tongjian Gangmu. The “guidelines” (Chinese: 綱; pinyin: gāng) are drawn from the official dynastic histories, while the “meshes” (Chinese: 目; pinyin: mù) incorporate material from continuations of the Zizhi Tongjian, unofficial histories, memorials, imperial edicts, and private literature.

Its chronological span begins in 881 with the uprising of Li Sigong (Chinese: 拓跋思恭; pinyin: Tuòbá Sīgōng) against Huang Chao, and concludes in 1231 with the secretive refuge of the former Western Xia minister Wáng Lìzhī (Chinese: 王立之; pinyin: Wáng Lìzhī) in Shēnzhōu.

== Editions ==
- First printed in 1825 by the Xiaoxianshanfang Studio (Chinese: 小峴山房; pinyin: Xiǎoxiàn Shānfáng).
- Facsimile reprint published in 1935 by the Wenkui Studio (Chinese: 文奎堂; pinyin: Wénkuí Táng) in Beiping (Beijing).
