= Serbian names in space =

Several space objects and features have been named after Serbian people or things in Serbia. These include planetary features on Mars and Venus, asteroids and exoplanets.

== Moon ==
- Pupin (crater)

== Venus ==
- Ivka crater
- Nana crater
- Radmila crater
- Zlata crater

== Mars ==
- Krupac
- Selevac
- Topola
- Jezero

== Asteroids ==
- 1564 Srbija
- 1605 Milankovitch
- 57868 Pupin
