= Hinder (disambiguation) =

Hinder is an American rock band.

Hinder or hindrance may also refer to:

- Hinder (surname)
- Hinder, an interference call in the sport of pickleball
- Five hindrances, in Buddhism; mental factors that interfere with meditation
- Steric hindrance, a slowing of chemical reactions resulting from Steric effects
