= Pupin =

Pupin may refer to:

- Mihajlo Pupin
- Pupin Hall
- Pupin (crater)
- Pupin Bridge
- 57868 Pupin, an asteroid
