= Hinder (surname) =

Hinder is a surname. Notable people with the surname include:

- Anna Hinderer (1827–1870), British missionary to Nigeria
- Eleanor Hinder (1893–1963), Australian internationalist
- Frank Hinder (1906–1992), Australian painter, sculptor and art teacher
- Jayson Hinder (1965–2017), Australian lawyer and politician
- Jonathan Hinder (born 1991), British Labour Party politician
- Margel Hinder (1906–1995), Australian-American sculptor
- Paul Hinder (born 1942), Catholic bishop
- Roman Hinderer (1668–1744), German Jesuit missionary in China
- Russell Hinder (born 1979), Australian basketball player
