= Amadeus William Grabau =

American scientist

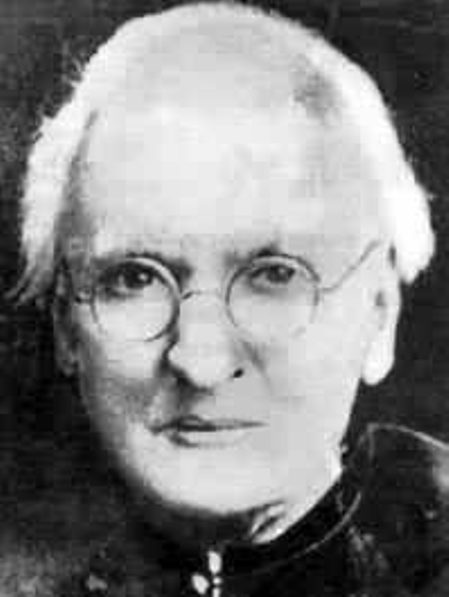
- Born: January 9, 1870; Cedarburg, Wisconsin, United States
- Died: March 20, 1946 (aged 76); Peking, China
- Resting place: compound of the geological department of the National University of Peking
- Monuments: Dorsum Grabau, a wrinkle ridge on the Moon named for him
- Other name: the father of Chinese geology
- Education: M.I.T., B.S. 1896; Harvard, M.S. 1898, D.Sc. 1900
- Occupation: Paleontologist
- Employers: M.I.T. c:a 1897; Rensselaer Polytechnic (1899–1901); Columbia (1901–19); National U., Peking, China (1919–46)
- Known for: work on stratigraphic deposits; invertebrate evolution; etc.
- Notable work: Principles of Stratigraphy (1913); Text Book of Geology (1920–21); Silurian Fossils of Yunnan (1920); Stratigraphy of China (1924–25); Early Permian Fossils of China (1934); etc.
- Spouse: Mary Antin (m. Oct. 5, 1901)
- Children: one daughter
- Relatives: Rev. Johannes Andreas August Grabau, grandfather
- Awards: Mary Clark Thompson Medal (1936); Hayden Memorial Geological Award (1941)

Amadeus William Grabau (January 9, 1870 – March 20, 1946) was an American geologist, teacher, stratigrapher, paleontologist, and author who worked in the United States and China.

== Biography ==
Grabau's grandfather, J.A.A. Grabau, led a group of dissident Lutheran immigrants from Germany to Buffalo, New York. His education began in his father's parochial school in his birthplace of Cedarburg, Wisconsin, and then the public high school there. After his father became head of the Martin Luther Seminary in 1885, he finished high school in Buffalo. He took classes in the evenings while apprenticed to a bookbinder. His interest in local fossils grew. In a correspondence course in mineralogy, he impressed geologist William Otis Crosby enough to hire him at the Boston Society of Natural History in 1890, and arrange his education at Boston Latin, MIT, and Harvard.

He taught at MIT and Rensselaer Polytechnic Institute early in his career. In 1901 he became a professor at Columbia University in New York. He married Barnard student Mary Antin on October 5, 1901. She would go on to become a prominent author.

Grabau's pro-German attitudes during World War I led to an estrangement from his wife, and in 1919 he left Columbia for China. He traveled to China to become a professor at Peking University and a member of the Chinese Geological Survey in October 1920. As part of his life's work, he conducted a geologic survey of China, and is now known as the father of Chinese geology.

In 1936, the National Academy of Sciences awarded him the Mary Clark Thompson Medal from for most important service to geology and paleontology. During World War II he remained in Peking. Around 1941 he was interned by the Japanese Imperial Army. His health declined precipitously, and he died of an internal hemorrhage after his release.

== Books ==
Grabau was also a prolific author, publishing at least 10 books in the first half of the 20th century. Grabau developed various theories during his lifetime, among them the theory of rhythms concerning the growth of the Earth's crust and a theory concerning mountain building and creation. The Dorsum Grabau, a wrinkle ridge on the Moon was named after him in 1976. A list of books written by Grabau, and their publication dates includes:

- North American Index Fossils (1909, 1910)
  - Grabau A. W. & Shimer H. W. 1909. Invertebrates. Volume I.. A. G. Seiler & Company, New York. (alternate scan)
  - Grabau A. W. & Shimer H. W. 1910. Invertebrates. Volume II.. New York.
- Principles of Stratigraphy (1913)
- Textbook of Geology (1920–21) Two volumes: Part I; Part II.
- Silurian Fossils of Yunnan (1920)
- Ordovician Fossils of North China (1922)
- Paleozoic Corals of China (1921)
- Stratigraphy of China (1924–25)
- Migration of Geosynclines (1924)
- Early Permian Fossils of China (1934)
- Rhythm of the Ages (1940)
