= Joseph-Anne-Marie de Moyriac de Mailla =

French missionary

- Born: December 16, 1669; Ain
- Died: June 28, 1748 (aged 78); Beijing, China
- Occupation: Jesuit missionary to China

Joseph-Anne-Marie de Moyriac de Mailla (also Anna, and de Moyria) (Chinese: 馮秉正; pinyin: Feng Bingzheng; 16 December 1669 – 28 June 1748) was a French Jesuit missionary to China.

== Biography ==
According to the 1913 Catholic Encyclopedia, Mailla was born at "Château Maillac on the Isère". Other sources mention Château de Maillat in Maillat, Ain. After finishing his studies, he joined the Society of Jesus in 1686, and, in 1701, was sent on a mission to China as a member of the Jesuits. In June, 1703, Father Mailla arrived in Morocco and thence set out for Canton where he acquired a thorough knowledge of Chinese language and writing.

He devoted himself particularly to the study of Chinese historical works. When the Kangxi Emperor entrusted the Jesuit missionaries with the cartographical survey of his empire, the provinces of Henan, Zhejiang, and Fujian, and the Island of Formosa, fell to the lot of Mailla along with Jean-Baptiste Régis and Roman Hinderer. When the work had been completed, the emperor conferred on Father Mailla the rank of mandarin as a mark of his satisfaction.

When Father Mailla died, in his seventy-ninth year, in Beijing, China, he was buried at the expense of the Qianlong Emperor, many people being present at the obsequies.

== Works ==
When he was fifty years old he began the study of the Manchu language, and made such progress that he was able to translate into French the Thoung-kian-kang-mou (Tongjian Gangmu), Zhu Xi's extract from the great Chinese annals, which on the orders of the Kangxi Emperor had been translated into the Manchu language. He finished the translation in several volumes in the year 1730, and in 1737 sent it to France, where it lay for thirty years in the library of the college at Lyon, Fréret, who purposed publishing it, having died.

After the suppression of the Jesuit order, the college authorities gave the manuscript to the Abbé Grosier on condition that he would see to the publication of the work. Not long after, the work appeared under the title Histoire générale de la Chine, ou Annales de cet Empire; traduit du Tong-kien-kang-mou par de Mailla, Paris, 1777-1783, in 12 volumes, with maps and plans. In 1785 a thirteenth volume followed. Besides Grosier, the Orientalists Deshauterayes and Colson were mainly responsible for the publication.

== Translator ==
Mailla was the first European scholar to translate the Shujing, a classic historical Chinese work. Mailla, also, in order to promote the work of the mission, compiled some religious books in Chinese; the most important being lives of the saints, and meditations on the Gospels of the Sundays throughout the whole year.

In Lettres édifiantes there are some letters from him on the persecution of the Christians which took place in China during his time.

== Significance ==
Being based on the Confucian orthodox text of Zhu Xi, Mailla's Histoire générale gives an idealised account of Chinese imperial history, which should also be read in context of the Rites controversy. For the time being it remained a sole source on Chinese history available in Europe. As a result, eighteenth-century Enlightenment leaders discussed China as an example of an ideal secular monarchy, a biased vision supported by Voltaire and opposed by Montesquieu.
