= Dorsum Grabau =

Wrinkle ridge on the Moon

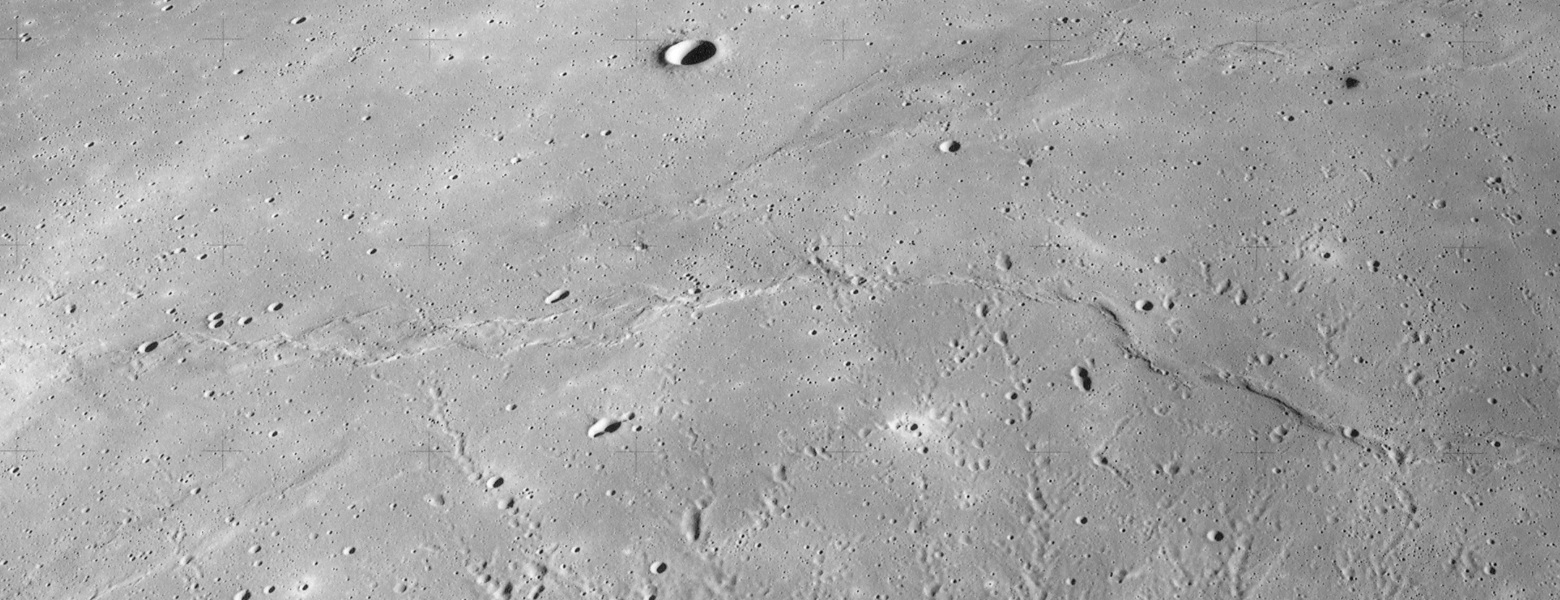
Oblique view facing north from Apollo 15. The small crater near top center is Landsteiner.

Dorsum Grabau is a wrinkle ridge at 29.4°N 15.9°W north of Timocharis crater in Mare Imbrium on the Moon. It is 124 km long and was named after American paleontologist Amadeus William Grabau in 1976.
