= Feuillée (crater) =

Crater on the Moon

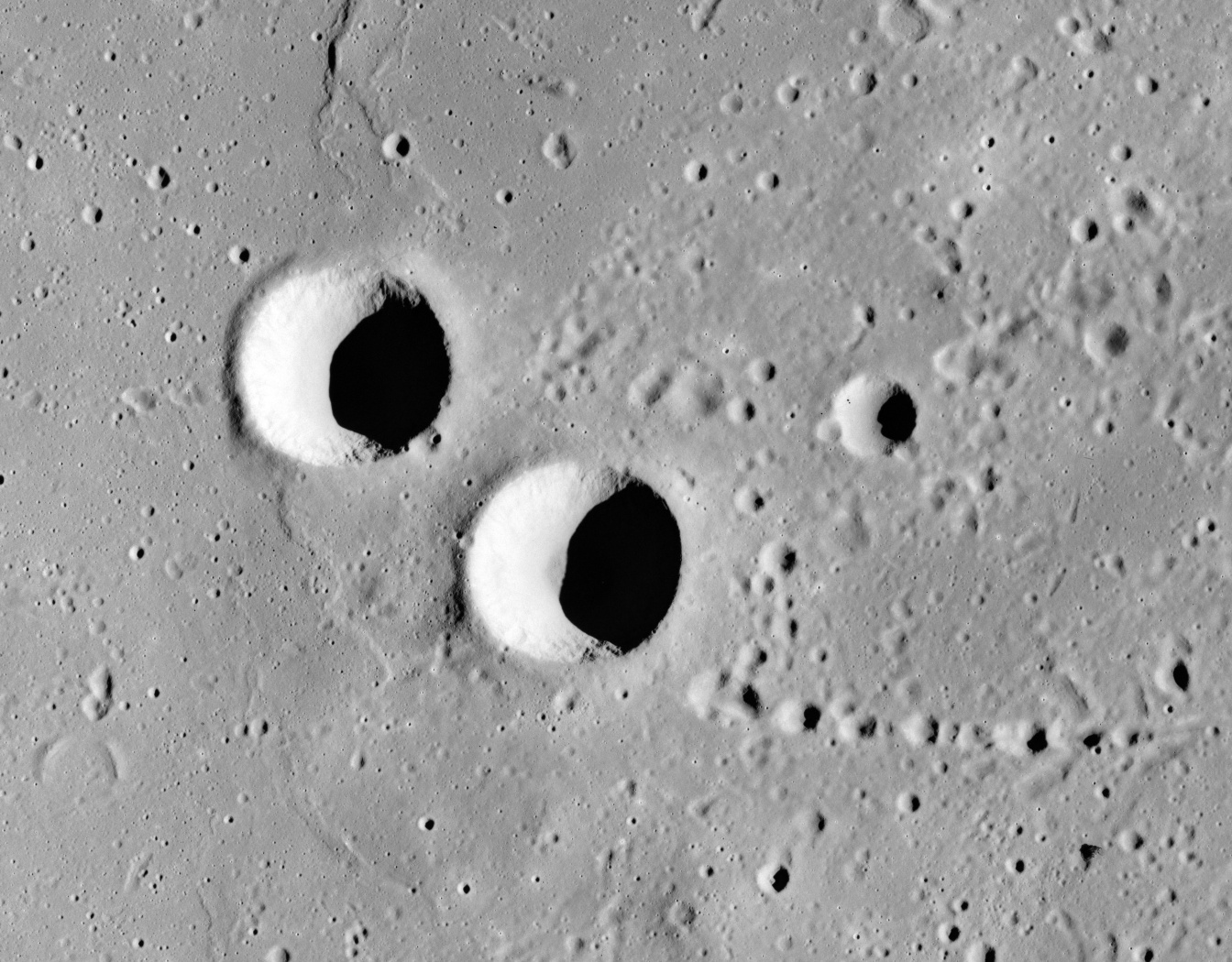
- Apollo 15 Mapping Camera image with Feuillée at left and Beer at right
- Coordinates: 27.4°N 9.4°W
- Diameter: 8.94 km (5.56 mi)
- Depth: 1.8 km (1.1 mi)
- Colongitude: 10° at sunrise
- Eponym: Louis Feuillée

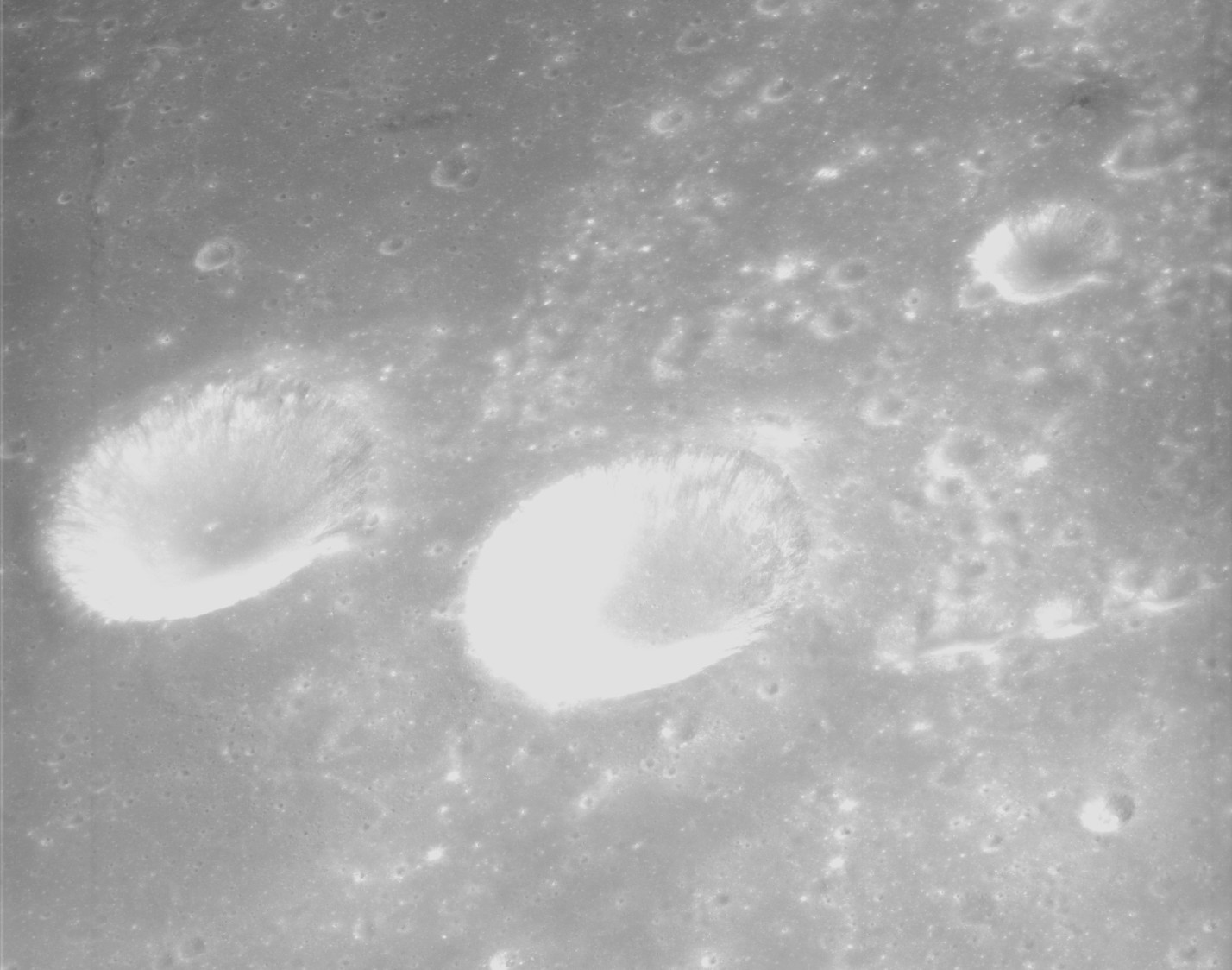
Oblique view from Apollo 15 Panoramic Camera

Feuillée is a small lunar impact crater in the eastern part of the Mare Imbrium. It lies less than a half crater diameter to the northwest of Beer, and the two formations form a nearly matched pair. To the west is the small but prominent crater Timocharis.

Like Beer, Feuillée is a circular, bowl-shaped formation with a small interior floor at the midpoint of the sloping inner walls. This sharp-edged crater is not notably worn or eroded, and lacks any distinguishing features. It does, however, lie across a wrinkle ridge in the surface of the lunar mare, a feature that is best observed under oblique lighting conditions when the crater is near the terminator.

This formation is named after French natural scientist Louis Feuillée (1660-1732). His name was introduced with the lunar nomenclature of German astronomer Johann Schmidt in 1874. Its designation was officially adopted by the International Astronomical Union in 1935. The crater name is incorrectly spelled Feuillet on some lunar charts.
