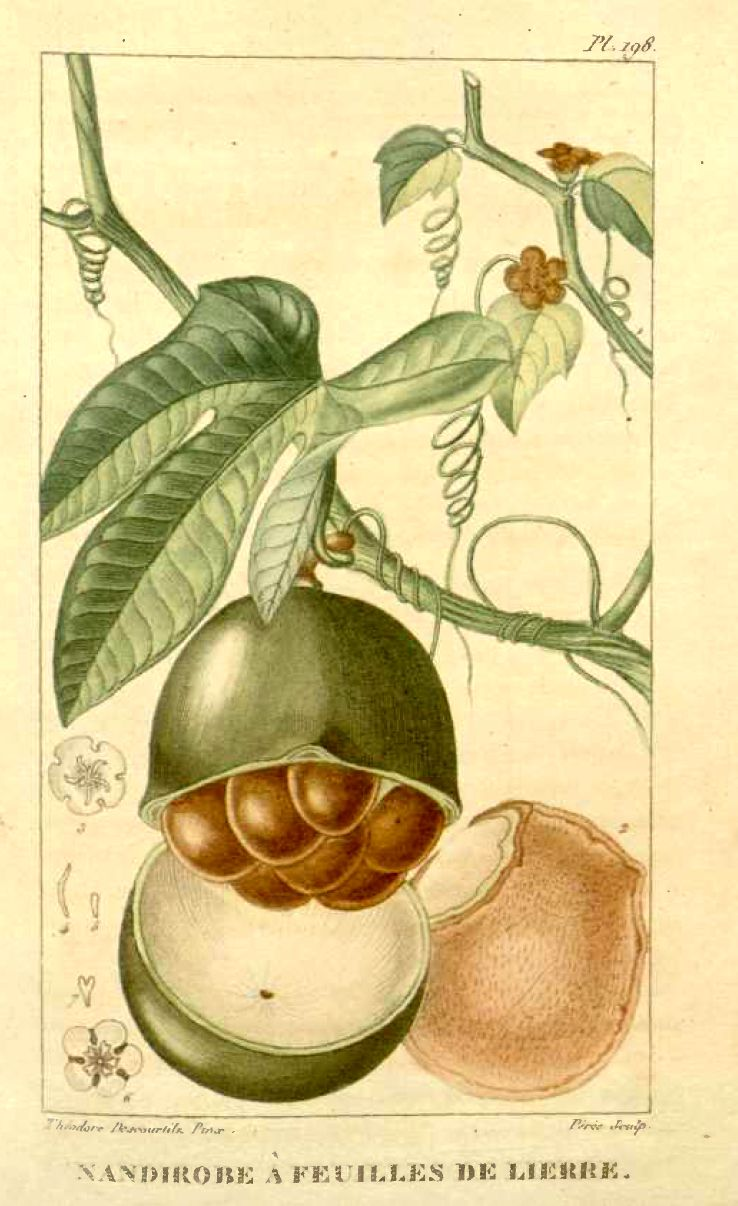

Scientific classification
- Kingdom: Plantae
- Clade: Tracheophytes
- Clade: Angiosperms
- Clade: Eudicots
- Clade: Rosids
- Order: Cucurbitales
- Family: Cucurbitaceae
- Genus: Fevillea
- Species: F. cordifolia

Binomial name
- Fevillea cordifolia L.

= Fevillea cordifolia =

Species of flowering plant

Fevillea cordifolia, also known as javillo and antidote caccoon, is a climbing vine of up to 20 m of the family Cucurbitaceae and occurring in South and Central America in Bolivia, Brazil, Colombia, Costa Rica, Ecuador, Nicaragua, Panama, Peru and Venezuela.

This dioecious species produces a globose, green fruit some 12 cm in diameter, dehiscing along a line about 2 cm from its base. Its leaves are 8-16 by 5.5–12 cm, entire, ovate-triangular or with 3-5 lobes, with axillary tendrils. Lax panicles are 10–15 cm long. Flowers with campanulate calyx, 5-lobed. Corolla with 5 lobes, yellow, orange or pink. The flowers with 5 stamens which are free, and with recurved filaments. The pistillate flowers produce a globose ovary with 3 carpels, and 3 styles more or less united. Seeds are numerous, orbicular or elliptical, and compressed.

Seeds, which contain the glucoside fevicordin, produce a fat with buttery texture, investigated in the 1980s as an internal combustion engine fuel by ethnobotanist James A. Duke. In Costa Rica and Honduras the indigenous people use the seeds as a laxative and for treating ailments such as parasites, fever and stomach cramps, septicemia in farmyard animals, and diarrhea.

== Synonyms ==
- Fevillea hederacea Poir.
- Fevillea javilla Kunth
- Fevillea karstenii Cogn.
- Fevillea punctata (L.)Poir.
- Fevillea scandens L.
- Fevillea triloba Sessé &Moc.
- Fevillea trilobata Reichard
- Fevillea uncipetala Kuhlm.
- Siolmatra mexiae Standl.
