= Fevillea =

- Fevillea trilobata

Scientific classification
- Kingdom: Plantae
- Clade: Embryophytes
- Clade: Tracheophytes
- Clade: Angiosperms
- Clade: Eudicots
- Clade: Rosids
- Order: Cucurbitales
- Family: Cucurbitaceae
- Tribe: Triceratieae
- Genus: Fevillea; L.

Species
- Fevillea anomalosperma M.Nee; Fevillea bahiensis G.L.Rob. & Wunderlin; Fevillea cordifolia L.; Fevillea narae A.Estrada & D.Santam.; Fevillea passiflora Vell.; Fevillea pedatifolia (Cogn.) C.Jeffrey; Fevillea pergamentacea (Kuntze) Cogn.; Fevillea trilobata L.

Synonyms
- Anisosperma Silva Manso; Feuillaea Gled., orth. var.; Feuillea Kuntze, orth. var.; Hypanthera Silva Manso; Nandiroba Adans., orth. var.; Nhandiroba Adans.

Genus of flowering plants

Fevillea is a genus of the plant family Cucurbitaceae (the cucumber, squash, and pumpkin family). Some references suggest that there is only one member of this genus, Fevillea cordifolia (antidote vine). Other online sources make reference to Fevillea pedatifolia (formerly Fevillea peruviana), Fevillea trilobata, and to Fevillea passiflora.

The genus is named after the French botanist Louis Feuillée.

Fevillea consists of dioecious vines or lianas. Two subgenera exist: Fevillea and Anisosperma. It is native to the Neotropics.
