= De Guignes =

The French language surname De Guignes literally means "from Guignes"/"of Guignes". It may refer to:

- Joseph de Guignes (1721–1800), French orientalist, sinologist and Turkologist
- Chrétien-Louis-Joseph de Guignes (1759–1845), French merchant-trader, ambassador and scholar

== See also ==
- de Guigné
