= Zizhi Tongjian =

1084 Chinese chronicle covering 403 BC – 959 AD

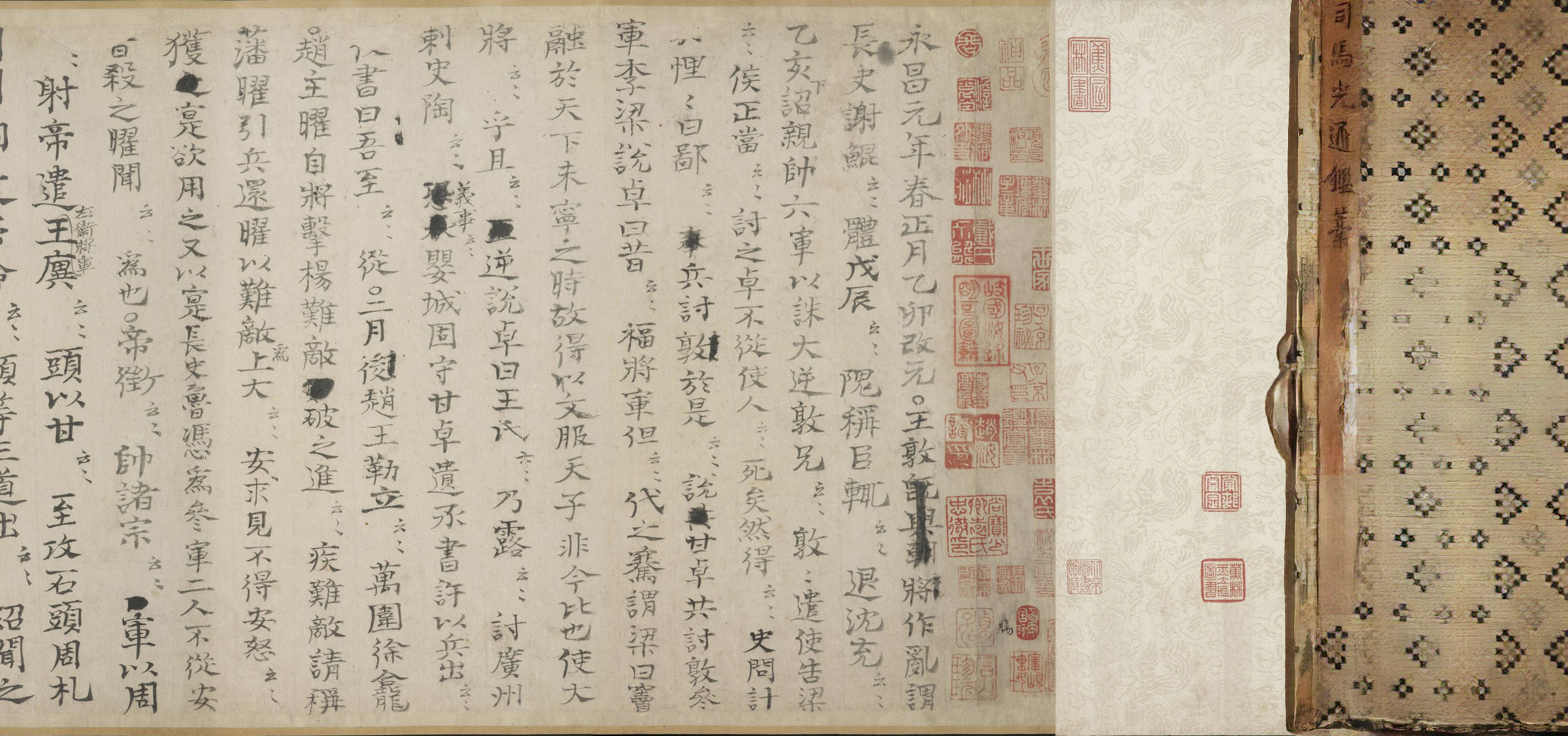
- Section from one of the original scrolls of the Zizhi Tongjian
- Author: Sima Guang et al.
- Language: Classical Chinese
- Subject: History of China
- Publication date: 1084
- Media type: Scrolls
- Original text: Zizhi Tongjian at Chinese Wikisource

Chinese name
- Traditional Chinese: 資治通鑑
- Simplified Chinese: 资治通鉴
- Literal meaning: "Comprehensive Mirror in Aid of Governance" (Note: The character 鑑 can be literally translated as 'mirror', but here means something more like 'reflection', as in "reflections on oneself".)
Transcriptions
Standard Mandarin
- Hanyu Pinyin: Zīzhì tōngjiàn
- Wade–Giles: Tzŭ^{1}-chih^{4} t'ung^{1}-chien^{4}
- IPA: [tsɹ̩́.ʈʂɻ̩̂ tʰʊ́ŋ.tɕjɛ̂n]
Yue: Cantonese
- Yale Romanization: Jī-jih tūng-gaam
- Jyutping: Zi1zi6 tung1gaam3
- IPA: [tsi˥.tsi˨ tʰʊŋ˥.kam˧]
Southern Min
- Tâi-lô: Tsu-tī thong-kàm
Middle Chinese
- Middle Chinese: [t͡siɪ.ɖɨ tʰuŋ.kˠam^{H}]

The Zizhi Tongjian is a chronicle published in 1084 during the Northern Song dynasty. It provides a record of Chinese history from 403 BC to 959 AD, covering 16 dynasties and spanning almost 1400 years. The main text is arranged into 294 scrolls (Chinese: 卷; pinyin: juàn), each equivalent to a chapter—totaling around 3 million Chinese characters.

In 1065, Emperor Yingzong of Song commissioned his official, Sima Guang (1019–1086), to lead a project to compile a universal history of China, and granted him funding and the authority to appoint his own staff. His team took 19 years to complete the work and in 1084 it was presented to Emperor Yingzong's successor Emperor Shenzong of Song. It was well-received and has proved to be immensely influential among both scholars and the general public. Endymion Wilkinson regards it as reference quality: "It had an enormous influence on later Chinese historical writing, either directly or through its many abbreviations, continuations, and adaptations. It remains an extraordinarily useful first reference for a quick and reliable coverage of events at a particular time", while Achilles Fang wrote "[Zizhi Tongjian], and its numerous re-arrangements, abridgments, and continuations, were practically the only general histories with which most of the reading public of pre-Republican China were familiar."

== The text ==
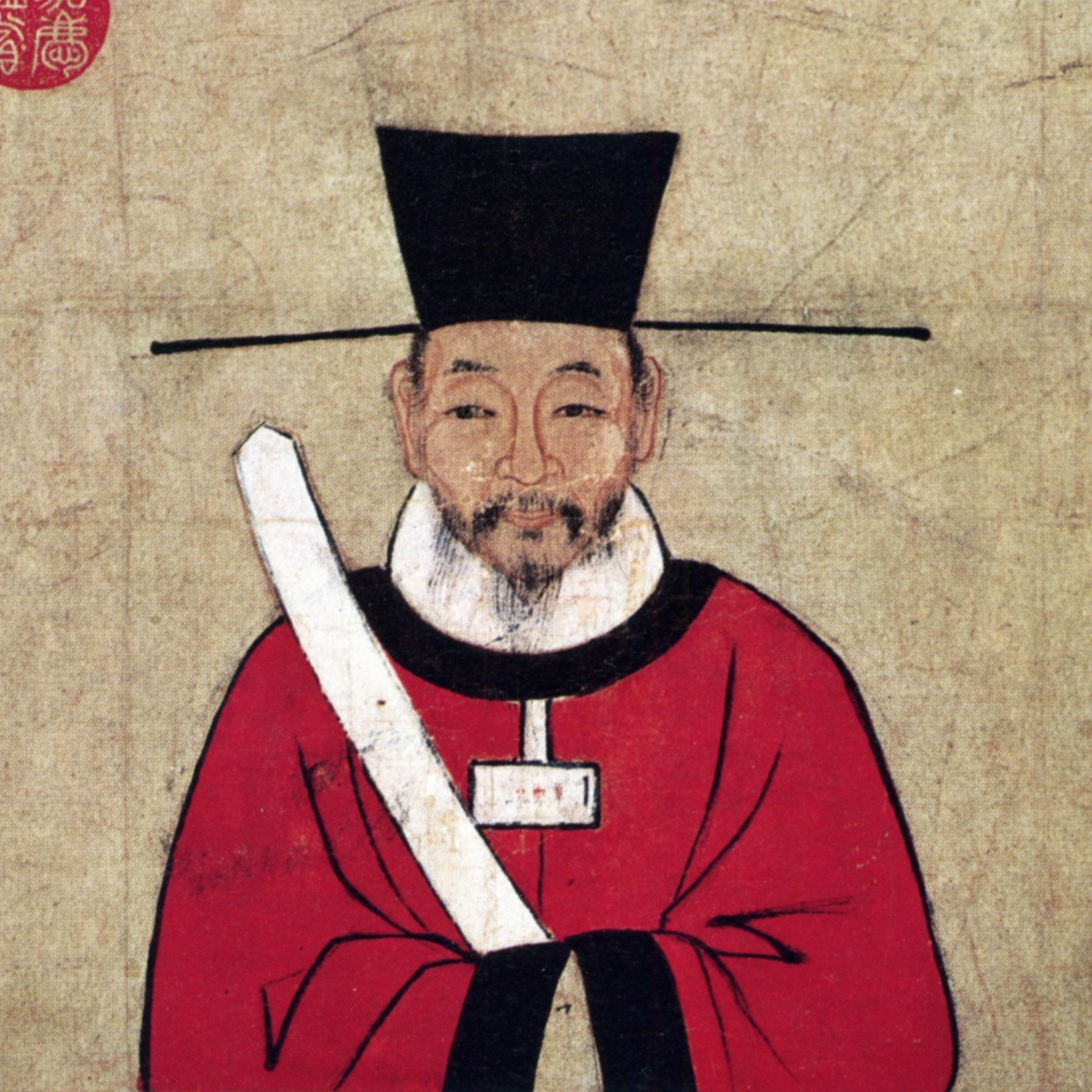
Sima Guang

The principal text of the Zizhi Tongjian comprises a year-by-year narrative of the history of China over 294 scrolls, sweeping through many Chinese historical periods (Warring States, Qin, Han, Three Kingdoms, Jin and the Sixteen Kingdoms, Southern and Northern dynasties, Sui, Tang, and Five Dynasties), supplemented with two sections of 30 scrolls each—'tables' (目錄; mùlù) and 'critical analysis' (考異; kǎoyì).

Sima Guang departed from the format used in traditional Chinese dynastic histories, consisting primarily of 'annals' (紀; jì) of rulers and 'biographies' (傳; zhuàn) of officials. Instead, Sima shifted from a 'biographical style' (紀傳體; jìzhuàntǐ) to a 'chronological style' (編年體; biānniántǐ). Guang wrote in a memorandum to the Emperor:

Since I was a child I have ranged through histories. It has appeared to me that in the annal-biography form the words are so diffuse and numerous that even an erudite scholar who reads them, again and again, cannot comprehend and sort them out. ... I have constantly wished to write a chronological history roughly in accordance with the form of the Tso-chuan (左傳), starting with the Warring States and going down to the Five Dynasties, drawing on other books besides the Official Histories and taking in all that a ruler ought to know—matters which are related to the rise and fall of dynasties and connected with the joys and sorrows of the people, and of which the good can become a model and the evil a warning.

Initially, Sima Guang hired Liu Shu (劉恕) and Zhao Junxi as his main assistants, but Zhao was soon replaced by Liu Ban (劉攽), a Han history expert. In 1070 Emperor Shenzong approved Guang's request to add Fan Zuyu (范祖禹), a Tang history expert. Because the Zizhi Tongjian is a distillation from 322 disparate sources, the selection, drafting, and editing processes used in creating the work as well as potential political biases of Sima Guang, in particular, have been the subject of academic debate.

== Derivative and commented works ==
In the 12th century, Zhu Xi produced a reworked, condensed version of the Zizhi Tongjian, known as the Zizhi Tongjian Gangmu. This version was itself later translated into Manchu as Tung giyan g'ang mu, upon the request of the Qing Kangxi Emperor. This Manchu version was itself translated into French by Jesuit missionary Joseph-Anne-Marie de Moyriac de Mailla. His 12-volume translation Histoire générale de la Chine, ou Annales de cet Empire; traduit du Tong-kien-kang-mou par de Mailla (1777–1783) was published posthumously in Paris. The condensed Zizhi Tongjian Gangmu was also the main source for Textes historiques, a political history of China from antiquity to 906, published in 1929 by the French Jesuit missionary Léon Wieger.

The Zhonghua Book Company edition contains textual criticism made by Yuan dynasty historian Hu Sanxing. The philosopher Wang Fuzhi also wrote a commentary on Tongjian, titled Comments After Reading the Tongjian (讀通鑑論; Du Tongjian Lun).

Historian Rafe de Crespigny has published annotated translations of chapters 44 to 69 in three successive works under the titles A Hundred Years of Han (2025), Emperor Huan and Emperor Ling (1989), and To Establish Peace (1996), altogether covering 57–220 AD, building upon the publication of Achilles Fang's 1952 annotated translation of the next ten chapters (70–79) covering up to 265 AD. There are also self-published translations into English of chapters 1–8, covering the years 403–207 BC and some additional sections pertaining to the Xiongnu people.

== Contents ==
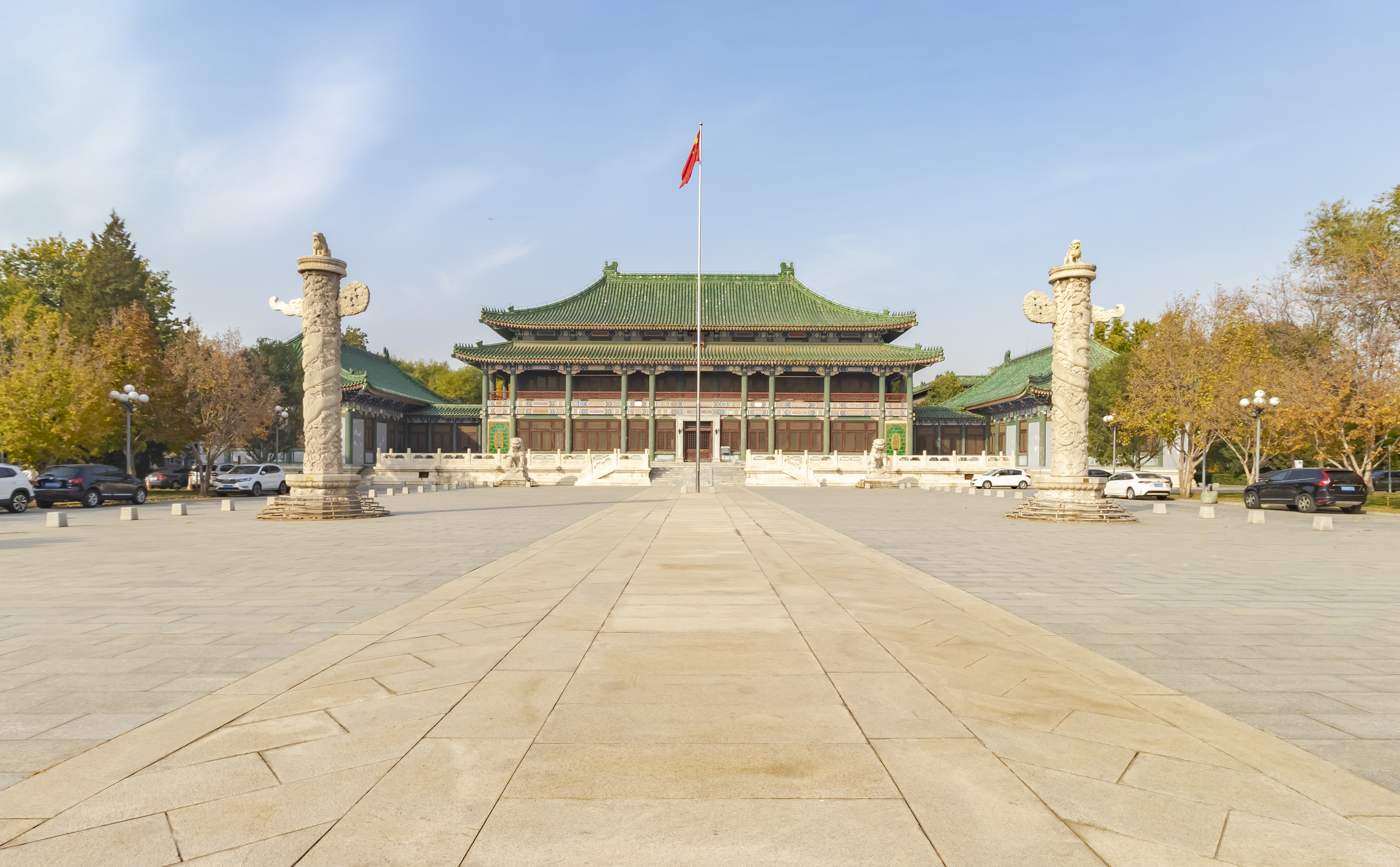
The only surviving eight chapters of the original manuscript are housed in the National Library of China Ancient Books Library, Beijing.

The book consisted of 294 chapters, of which the following number describe each respective dynastic era:

1. 5 chapters – Zhou (1046–256 BC)
2. 3 chapters – Qin (221–207 BC)
3. 60 chapters – Han (206 BC – 220 AD)
4. 10 chapters – Wei (220–265)
5. 40 chapters – Jin (266–420)
6. 16 chapters – Liu Song (420–479)
7. 10 chapters – Qi (479–502)
8. 22 chapters – Liang (502–557)
9. 10 chapters – Chen (557–589)
10. 8 chapters – Sui (589–618)
11. 81 chapters – Tang (618–907)
12. 6 chapters – Later Liang (907–923)
13. 8 chapters – Later Tang (923–936)
14. 6 chapters – Later Jin (936–947)
15. 4 chapters – Later Han (947–951)
16. 5 chapters – Later Zhou (951–960)

== See also ==
- Culture of the Song dynasty
- History of the Song dynasty
- Records of the Grand Historian

== Notes ==
=== Sources ===
- 通鑑綱目 [Chinese Literature: Tongjian gangmu]. Archived from the original on October 11, 2007.
- Barenghi, Maddalena (2014). Historiography and narrative construction of the Five Dynasties Period (907-960) in the Zizhi tongjian and its sources (Doctoral dissertation). Ca' Foscari University of Venice.
- Chan, Ming K. (1975). "The Historiography of the Tzu-chih t'ung-chien: A Survey". Monumenta Serica. 31: 1–38. doi:10.1080/02549948.1974.11731093. JSTOR 40726165.
- Chen, Guangchong. "Zizhi Tongjian ("Comprehensive Mirror to Aid in Government")". Encyclopedia of China (1st Chinese History ed.).
- De Crespigny, Rafe (1973). "Universal Histories". In Leslie, Donald D.; Mackerras, Colin; Gungwu, Wang (eds.). Essays on the Sources for Chinese History. Columbia: University of South Carolina Press. pp. 64–70.
- Fang, Achilles (1952). The Chronicle of the Three Kingdoms. Harvard-Yenching Institute Studies VI, Harvard University Press.
- Needham, Joseph (1954). Science and Civilisation in China. Vol. 1. Cambridge University Press. ISBN 978-052105799-8.
- Partington, James Riddick (1960). A History of Greek Fire and Gunpowder. Cambridge: W. Heffer & Sons.
- Tillman, Hoyt (2004). "Textual Liberties and Restraints in Rewriting China's Histories The Case of Ssu-ma Kuang's Re-construction of Chu-ko Liang's Story". In Lee, Thomas H.C. (ed.). The New and the Multiple. Hong Kong: Chinese University Press.
- Wilkinson, Endymion (2000). Chinese History: a manual (Revised and enlarged ed.). Cambridge: Harvard University Asia Center. ISBN 0-674-00249-0.
- Xiao-bin, Ji (2003). "Mirror for Government: Ssu-ma Kuang's Thought on Politics and Government". In Lee, Thomas H.C. (ed.). Tzu-chih t'ung-chien. Hong Kong: Chinese University Press. pp. 1–32.
- Xu, Elina-Qian (2005). "2.1 Introduction to the Sources on the Pre-dynastic Khitan". Historical development of the pre-dynastic Khitan (Doctoral dissertation). University of Helsinki, Faculty of Arts, Institute for Asian and African Studies.
- Yang, Bo. Modern Chinese Edition of Zizhi Tongjian. Vol. 1. Taipei: Yuan-Liou Publishing Co. ISBN 957-32-0795-8. The first of a set of 72 volumes.
- Yap, Joseph P. (2009). Wars With The Xiongnu, A Translation from Zizhi tongjian. Bloomington, IN: AuthorHouse. ISBN 978-1-4490-0604-4..
- Yap, Joseph P. (2016). Zizhi tongjian: Warring States and Qin by Sima Guang Volume 1 to 8 - 403-207 BCE. Translated by Yap, Joseph P. North Charleston, SC: CreateSpace. ISBN 978-153308693-8. With annotations and translation of Yang Kuan's textual research on the Warring States.
