= Beer (lunar crater) =

Lunar impact crater

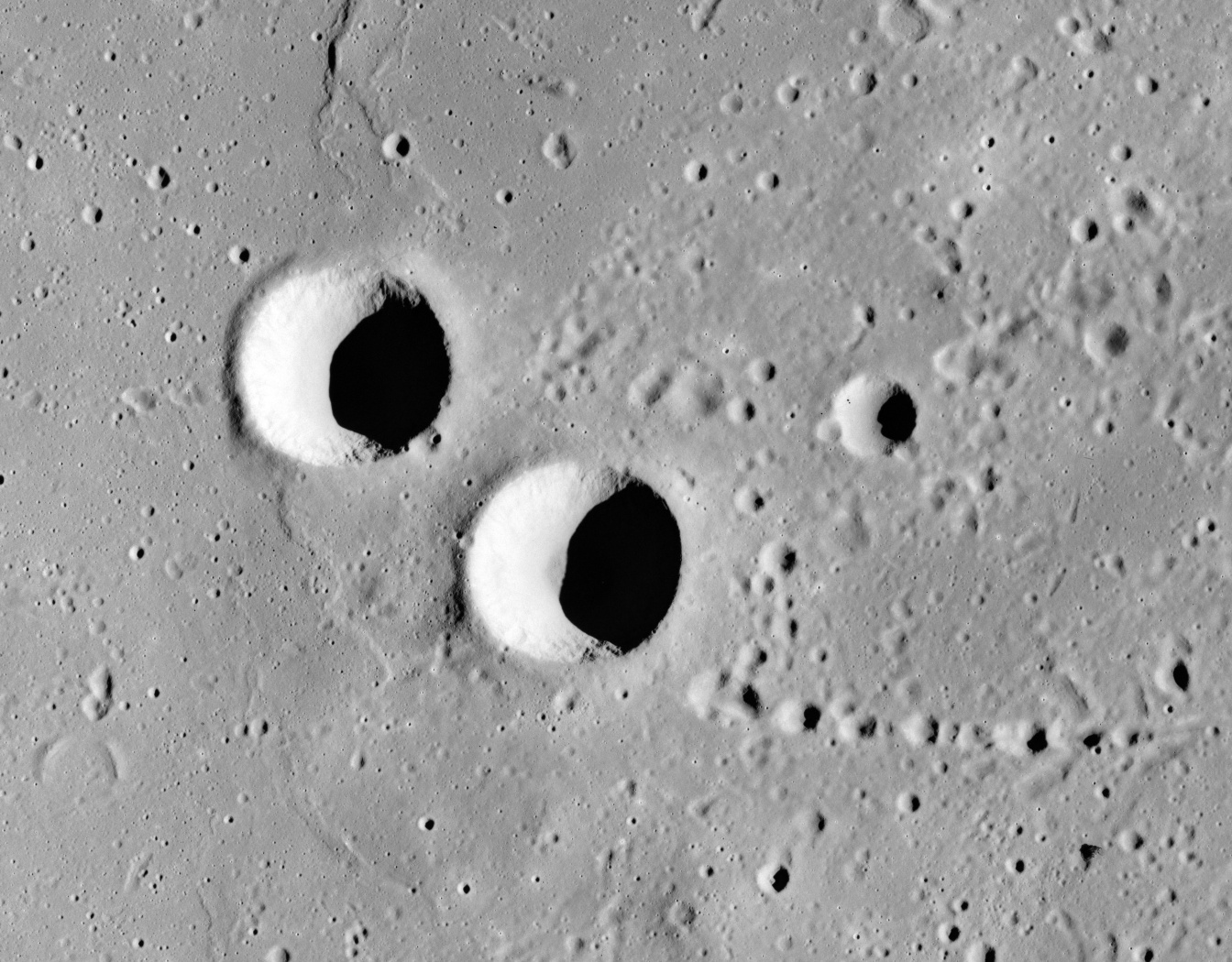
- Apollo 15 Mapping Camera image with Feuillée at left and Beer at right
- Coordinates: 27.1°N 9.1°W
- Diameter: 9.06 km (5.63 mi)
- Depth: 1.67 km (1.04 mi)
- Colongitude: 9° at sunrise
- Eponym: Wilhelm W. Beer

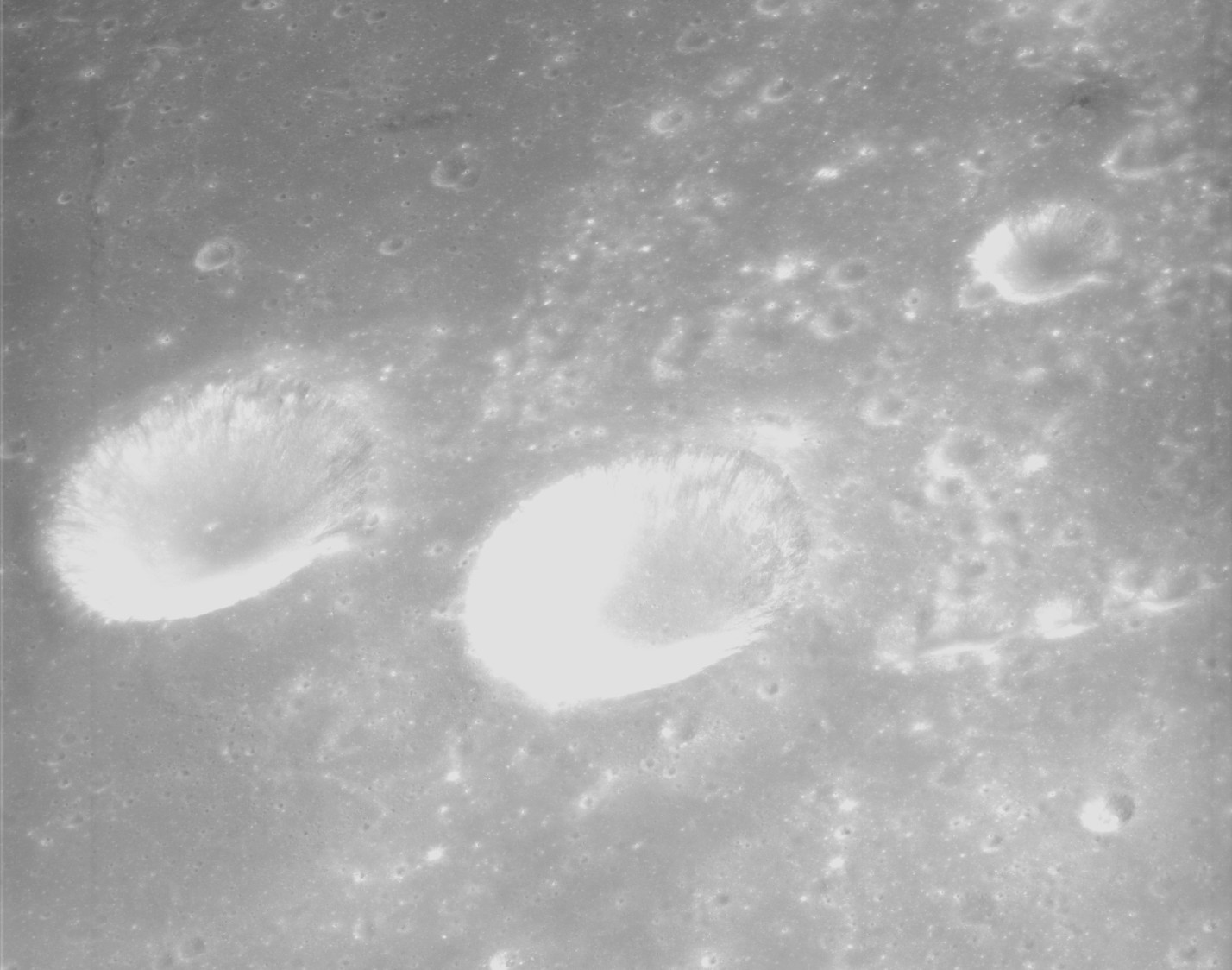
Oblique view from Apollo 15 Panoramic Camera

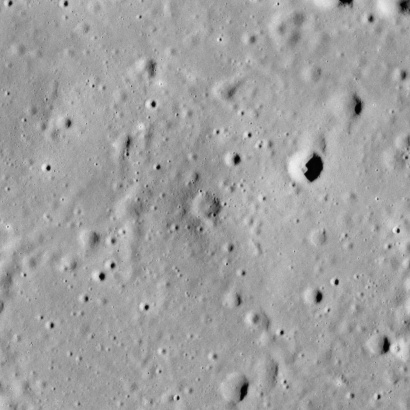
Lunar dome south of Beer crater

Beer is a relatively small lunar impact crater located on the Mare Imbrium, to the east of the crater Timocharis. Just to the northwest is the matching twin Feuillée.

Beer is a circular, cup-shaped crater with a sharp-edged rim that has not been significantly eroded. The interior has a higher albedo than the surrounding lunar mare, which is usually an indication of a relatively young crater. A string of craters arc away from the rim to the southeast, which then grade into a straight rille, and were once known as Fossa Archimedes or Archimedes Rille, but now are officially unnamed.

The mare to the east has a higher albedo than the surrounding surface, and this lighter-hued surface reaches to the base of the Montes Archimedes. To the southeast of Beer is a lunar dome that is of comparable diameter to the crater.

This crater was named after German astronomer Wilhelm W. Beer. Its designation was formally adopted by the International Astronomical Union in 1935. The name was incorporated into lunar nomenclature by William R. Birt and John Lee during the 19th century.

== Satellite craters ==
By convention these features are identified on lunar maps by placing the letter on the side of the crater midpoint that is closest to Beer.

| Beer | Latitude | Longitude | Diameter |
|---|---|---|---|
| A | 27.2° N | 8.6° W | 4 km |
| B | 25.7° N | 9.0° W | 2 km |
| E | 27.8° N | 7.8° W | 3 km |
