= Heinrich (crater) =

Lunar crater

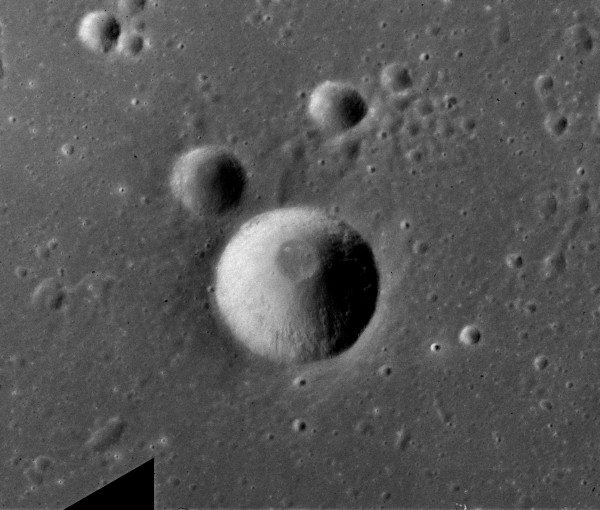
- Apollo 15 image
- Coordinates: 24.8°N 15.3°W
- Diameter: 6 km
- Depth: 1.18 km
- Colongitude: 16° at sunrise
- Eponym: Vladimír Václav Heinrich

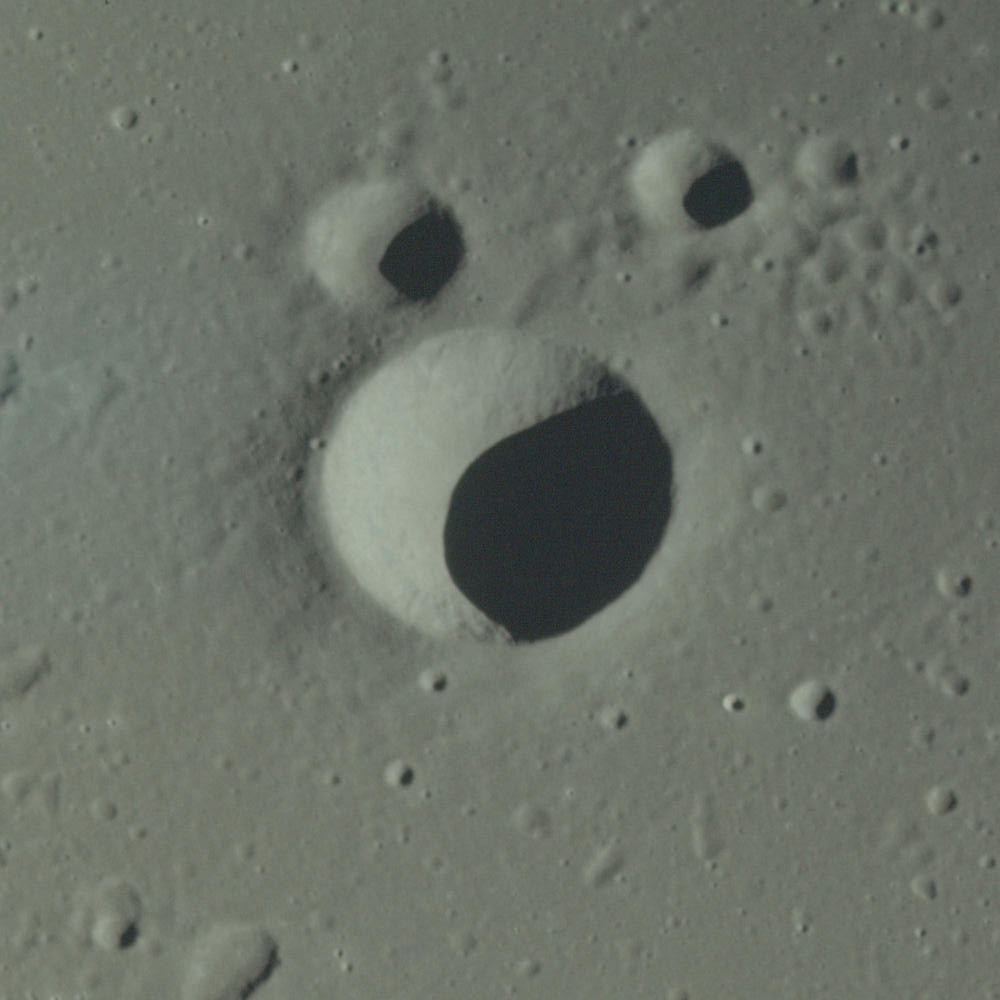
Apollo 17 image

Heinrich is a small lunar impact crater on the Mare Imbrium, a lunar mare in the northwest quadrant of the Moon's near side. It was named after Czechoslovak astronomer Vladimír Václav Heinrich. It is a circular, bowl-shaped formation very similar to many other craters of comparable size on the Moon.

Heinrich lies to the southwest of the prominent crater Timocharis, and was previously designated as Timocharis A before being given its current name by the IAU. It is otherwise a relatively isolated formation with only a few tiny satellite craters of Timocharis located nearby.
