= Louis Feuillée =

French explorer, astronomer, geographer and botanist

Louis Éconches Feuillée
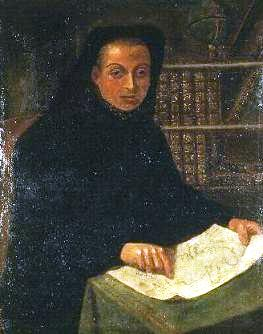
- Feuillée, pointing at a map of Martinique
- Born: 1660; Mane, Alpes-de-Haute-Provence, France
- Died: 18 April 1732 (aged 71–72); Marseille, France
- Scientific career
- Fields: Botany, astronomy, geography
- Author abbrev. (botany): Feuillée

Louis Éconches Feuillée (sometimes spelled Feuillet; 1660 – 18 April 1732) was a French member of the Order of the Minims, explorer, astronomer, geographer and botanist.

== Biography ==
Feuillée was born in Mane in Provence in 1660. He was educated at the Minim convent of Mane. He was taught astronomy and cartography by Jean Mathieu de Chazelles, and Charles Plumier, who had described some 6,000 species of plants during a voyage to the Caribbean, taught him botany.

He attracted the attention of members of the Academy of Sciences and in 1699 was sent by order of the king on a voyage to the Levant with Giovanni Domenico Cassini to determine the geographical positions of a number of seaports and other cities. The success of the undertaking led him to make a similar journey to the Antilles in 1703. He left Marseille on 5 February 1703 and arrived at Martinique on 11 April.

In September of the following year he began a cruise along the northern coast of South America, making observations at numerous ports. In the Antilles, he collected new species of flora and drew a map of Martinique; he also explored the Venezuelan coast. He returned to France in June 1706. his work won recognition from the Government, and he immediately began preparations for a more extended voyage along the western coast of South America to continue his observations. He received the title of "Royal Mathematician" from Louis XIV, and armed with letters from the ministry, set sail from Marseille on 14 December 1707.

In 1707, he voyaged to what is now Argentina, rounded Cape Horn at the end of 1708 after a tempestuous voyage, and arrived at Concepción, Chile on 20 January 1708. He remained in that city for a month, conducting astronomic, botanical, and zoological surveys and at the end of February traveled to Valparaíso. He then traveled to Peru and returned to France in August 1711, where he published a complete inventory of his observations in three volumes (1714–1725). Louis XIV granted him a pension and built an observatory for him at the convent of the Minims in Marseille.

The Spanish colonies of Central and South America seemed to have received many visits by French scientists during this period. These men served both as unofficial "scientific advisors" –but also as spies. Between 1735 and 1744, scientists like Louis Godin, Charles Marie de La Condamine, and Pierre Bouguer would take part in similar expeditions.

He died in Marseille.

== South American discoveries ==
During this South American voyage, he had described and mapped the islands of Trinidad and Tobago, the Río de la Plata, the Sebald Islands (Falkland Islands), the bay of Concepción, Coquimbo, Arica, Lima, the roads of Callao, and the town of Pisco. He sketched panoramic views of many South American places. He also provided a description of Fragaria chiloensis, the Concepción strawberry: "Several fruits, like pears, apples, strawberries, etc. were ripe. For dessert we were served some strawberries of a marvellous taste, whose size equalled that of our largest nuts. Their color is a pale white. They are prepared in the same manner as we fix them in Europe, and, although they have neither the color nor the taste of ours, they do not lack excellence." Feuillée did not include a specimen of this strawberry in the botanical collection he returned to Brest. Four months after Feuillée returned to France, Louis XIV dispatched the engineer Amédée-François Frézier to South America to report on Spanish fortifications there. Frézier became the first to bring back specimens of Fragaria chiloensis of this New World fruit to the Old World. Frézier also disagreed with Feuillée in regard to the latter's measurement of the latitudes and longitudes of the South American coast and of the principal ports of Chile and Peru. Frézier actually pointed out several mistakes in Feuillée's Relation, which led to a bitter feud between the two travelers.

Upon his departure, with a hydrometer of his own invention, Feuillée showed the Mediterranean was saltier than the Atlantic, which proved its diffusion and advection (including their combination, convection currents) through the Strait of Gibraltar insufficient to cancel out their differing evaporation, precipitation and river discharge profiles. He attributed the fact chiefly to the freshwater of the Amazon and other jungle rivers flowed far into the Atlantic, at a time when the complexities of the salinity of ocean water were little studied He drew a new map of South America. is work made it possible to position more exactly the Pacific and Atlantic coasts of the conical continent of South America. He also discovered in the southern Milky Way three dark nebulas of absorbing dust. In terms of botany, Feuillée studied the fuchsia, the nasturtium, the oxalis, the alstromeria, the papaya, the cherimoya, and the solanum.

He discovered, one century before Alexander von Humboldt, the existence of the large circular current skirting the Chilean and Peruvian coasts (now called the Humboldt Current).

He also noted the 6-month-delayed order of the seasons south of the Equator, as compared with their sequence in the Northern Hemisphere.

== Other voyages ==
In 1724, on his fourth and last voyage, he travelled to the Canary Islands and determined the position of the meridian at Hierro.

== Feuillée's monster ==
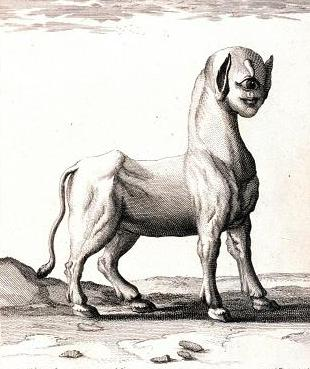
Feuillée's monster

Feuillée scientifically described many South American plants for the first time. He also described a cyclopian sheep that he was permitted to see in Buenos Aires. This sheep became later known as Feuillée's monster:

The monster which is shown in the figure appeared in Buenos Aires on 26 August. The contrast of three resemblances which it had, that of a child, a horse, and a calf, surprised all who saw it. I asked the person who showed it to me if I could examine it in order to describe it faithfully, but he never allowed me to do this. I examined it from quite close and drew its principal traits without his noticing. As soon as I returned to my room, having all the information about the monster vividly in my memory, it furnished what was missing from the drawing. I completed it and represented it in its natural color.

== Plants and locations named after Feuillée ==
- The genus of plants Fevillea (or Feuillea) and Indofevillea, a genus in the family Cucurbitaceae in India.
- The pacay, or ice-cream bean, Inga feuilleei
- The lunar crater Feuillée

== Works by Feuillée ==
- Journal des observations physiques, mathématiques, et botaniques (Paris, 1714).
- Suite du Journal (Paris, 1725).

== Gallery ==
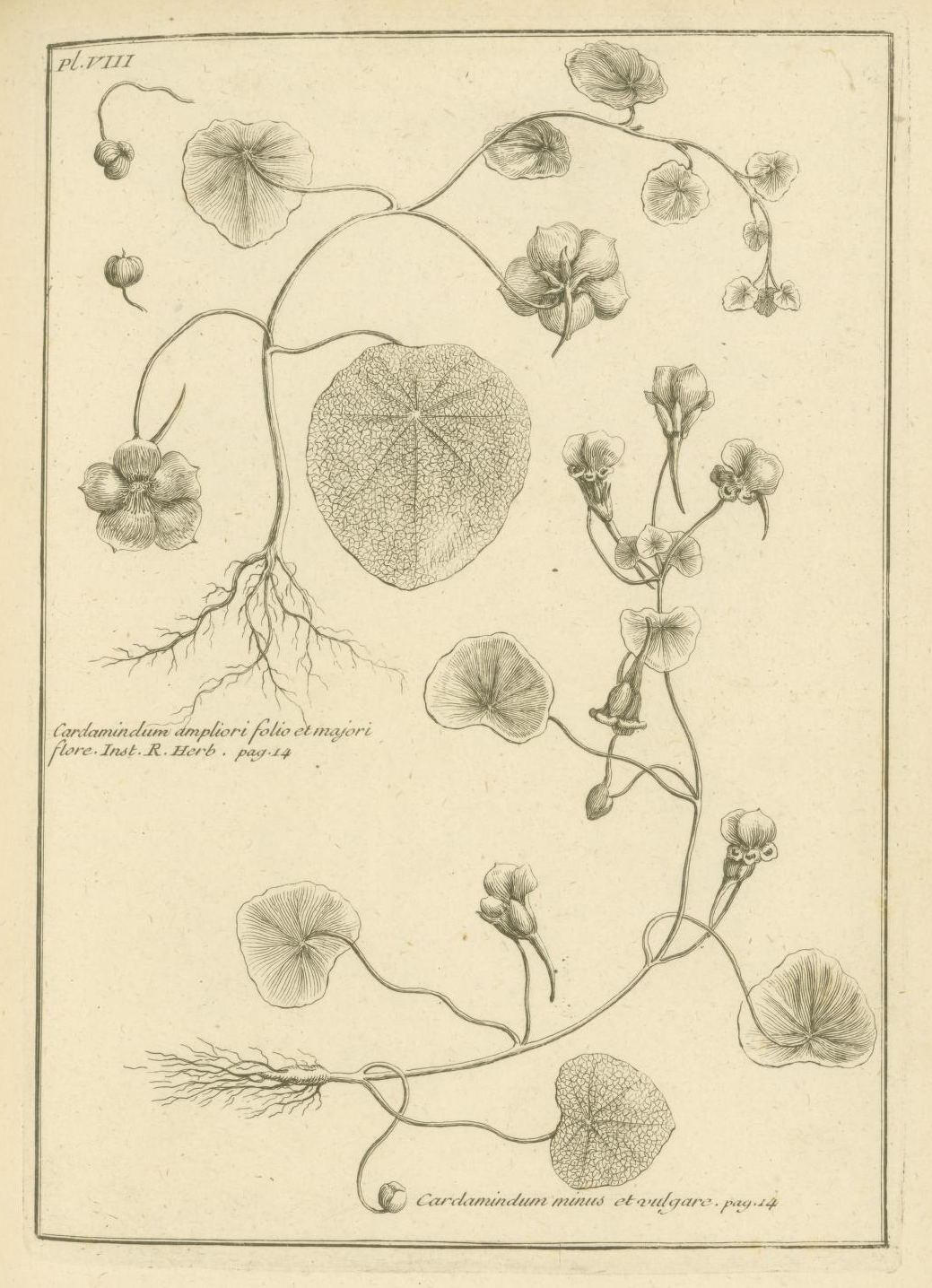

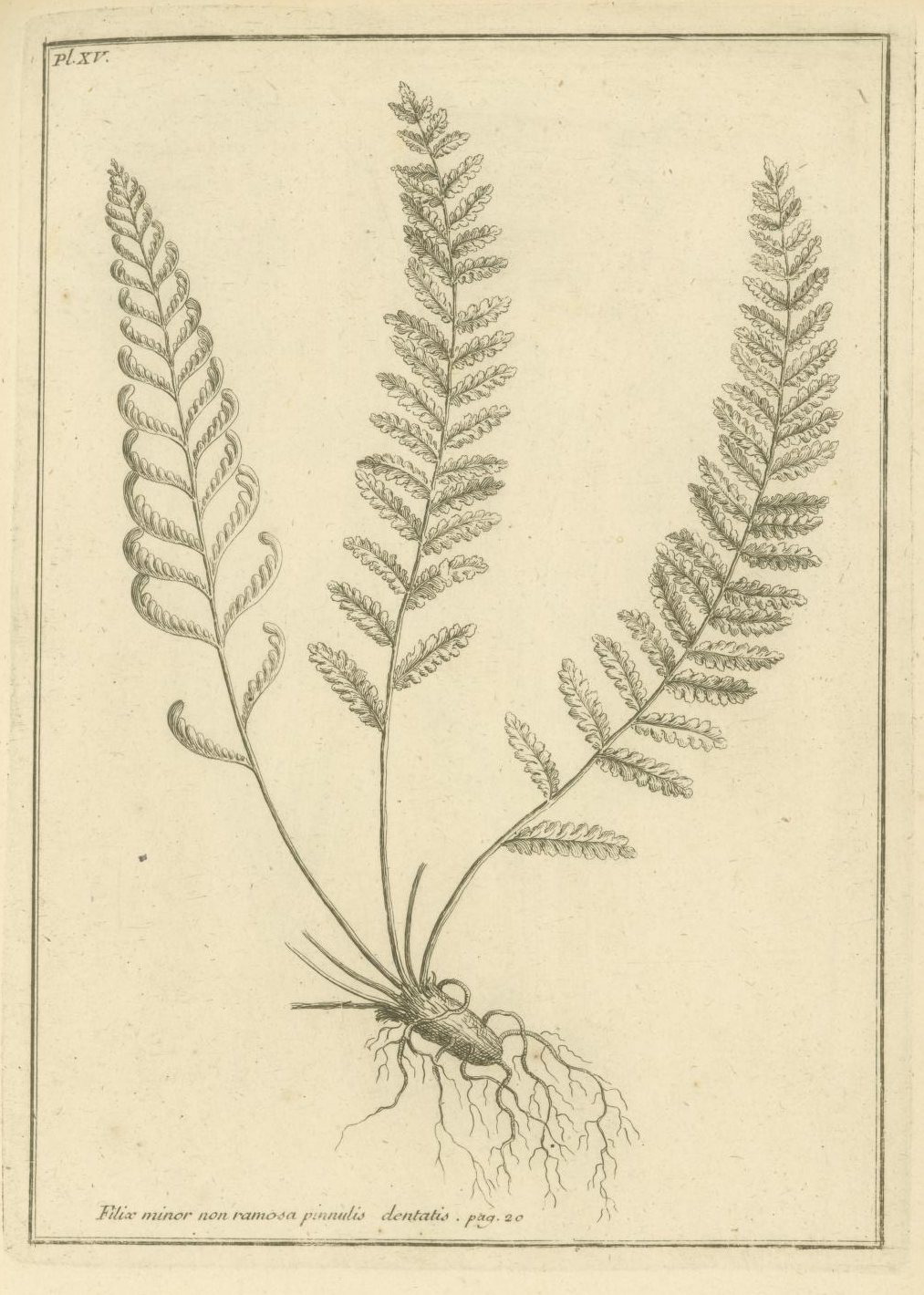

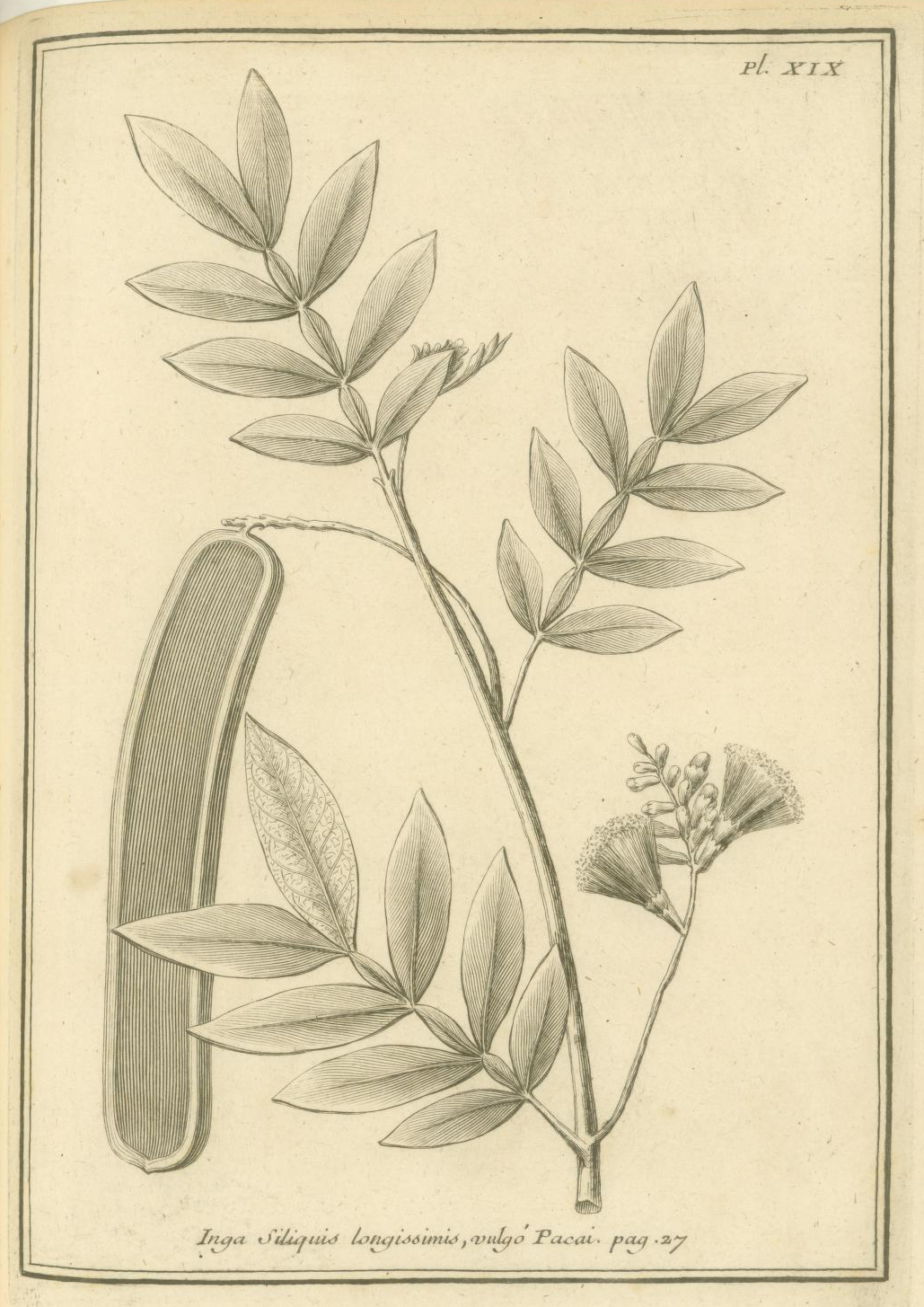

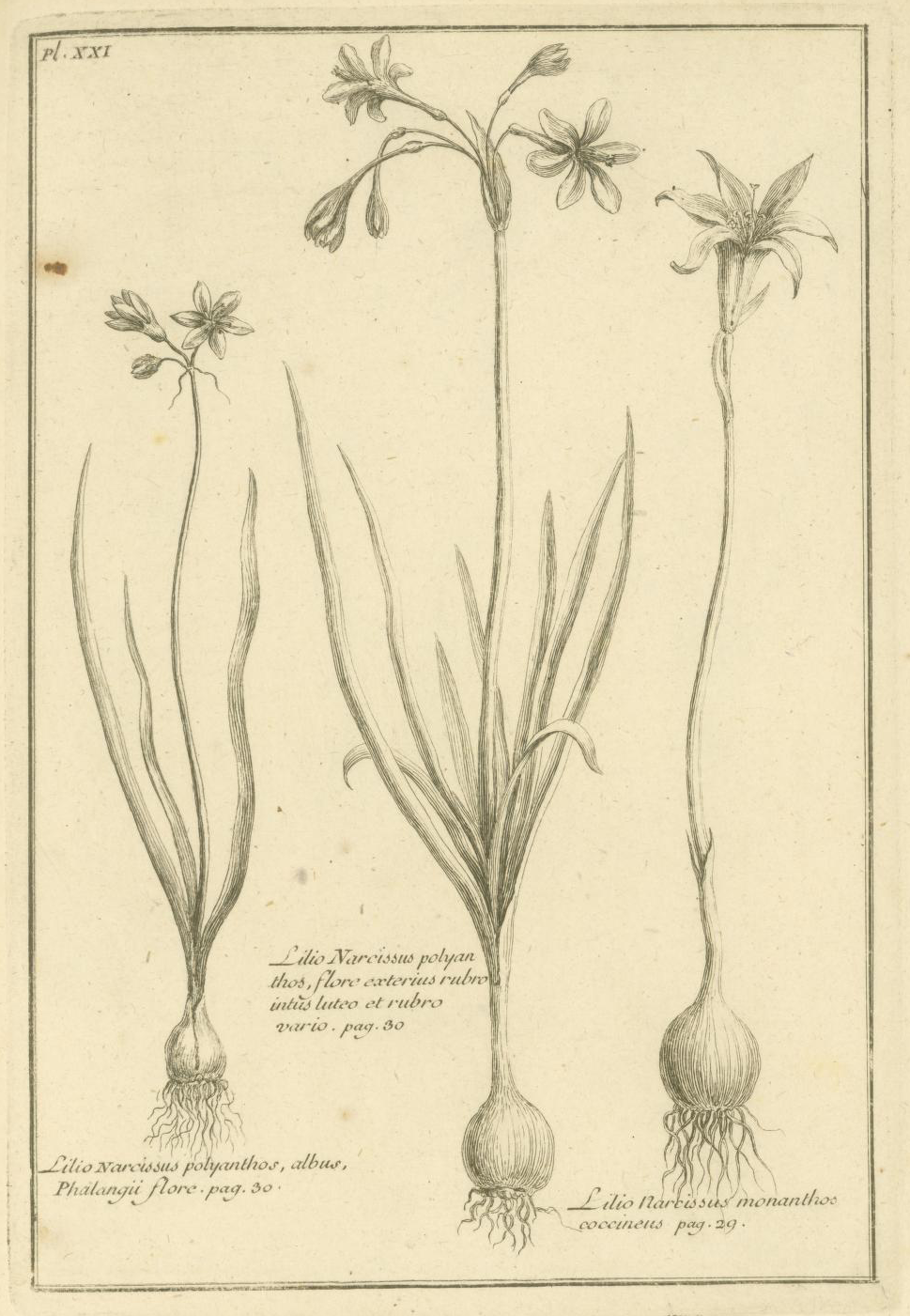

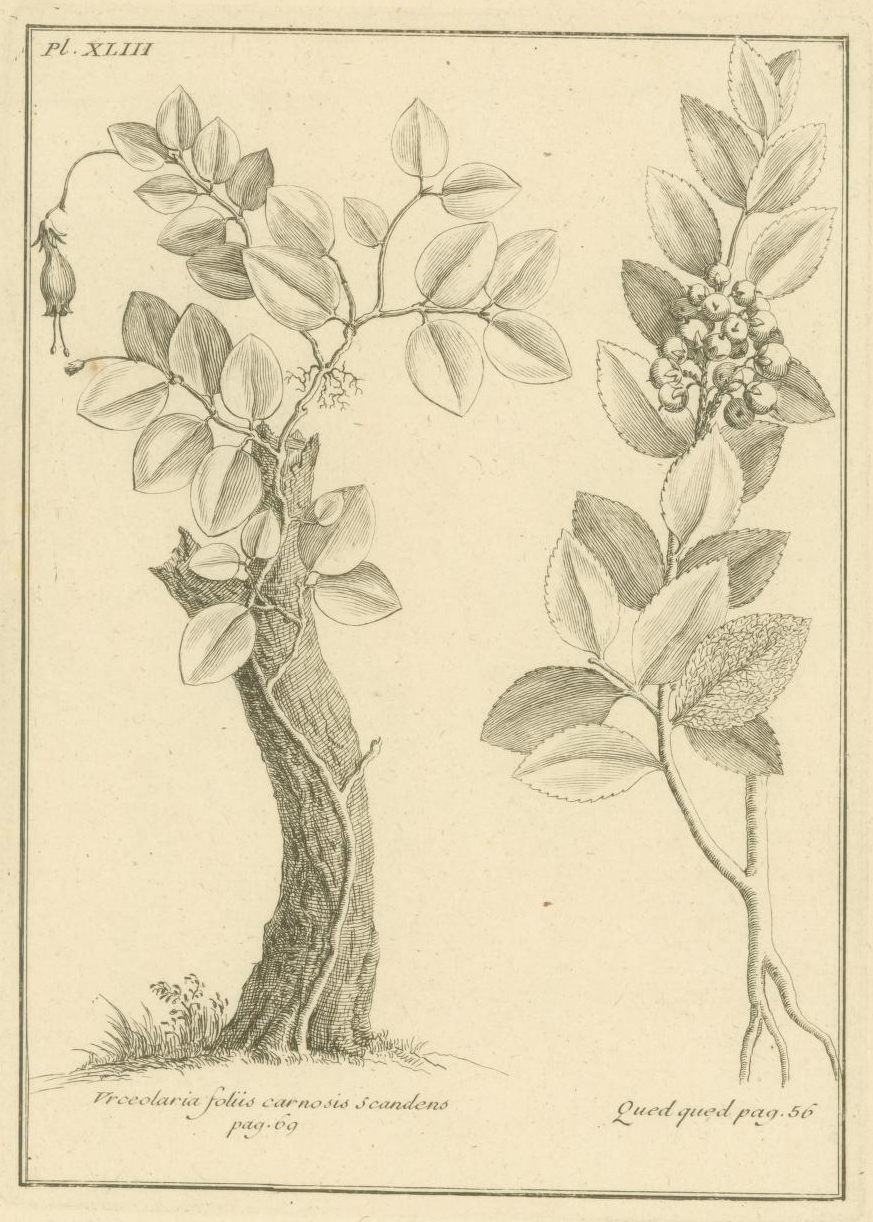

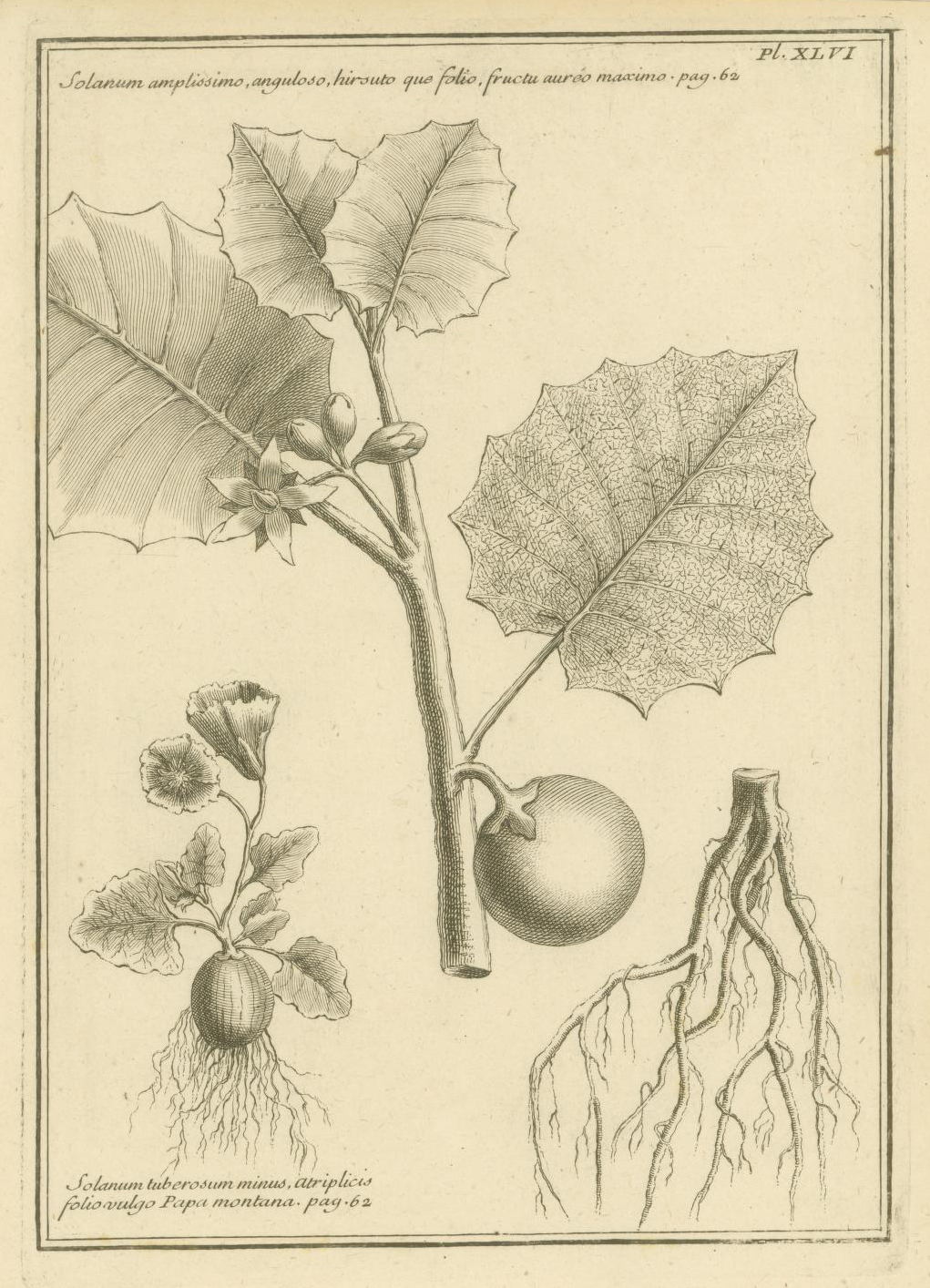

== See also ==
- List of Roman Catholic scientist-clerics
