= Antoine Gaubil =

French Jesuit missionary (1689–1759)

Antoine Gaubil (b. at Gaillac, Tarn, 14 July 1689; d. at Beijing, 24 July 1759) was a French Jesuit missionary to China.

== Life ==
He entered the Society of Jesus, 13 September 1704, was sent to China, where he arrived 26 June 1722. He then lived in Beijing for the rest of his life. His Chinese name was Song Junrong (宋君榮).

He had taken Dominique Parrenin's place as head of the school in which Manchus were taught Latin, to act as interpreters in Russian affairs. Gaubil, the best astronomer and historian among the French Jesuits in China during the eighteenth century, carried on an extensive correspondence with the savants of his day, among them Fréret and Delisle.

== Works ==
His works are numerous. Among them is "Traité de l'Astronomie Chinoise" in the Observations mathématiques, published by Étienne Souciet (Paris, 1729–1732). From Chinese sources Gaubil translated the history of Genghis Khan (Histoire de Gentchiscan (Paris, 1739) and part of the annals of the Tang dynasty (in Mémoires concernant les Chinois. vols. XV and XVI); he also wrote a treaty on Chinese chronology (Traité de la Chronologie Chenoise, Paris, 1814), and executed a good translation of the second of the Chinese classics, the Book of Documents, edited by De Guignes (Paris, 1770).

Gaubil left a great number of manuscripts now kept in the Observatory and Naval Depot (Paris) and in the British Museum (London). From three manuscript volumes kept formerly at the Ecole Sainte-Geneviève (Paris) there were published "Situation de Holin en Tartarie" (T'oung Pao, March, 1893) and "Situation du Japon et de la Corée" (T'oung Pao, March, 1898).

Abel Rémusat in "Nouveaux Mélanges Asiatiques" (II, p. 289), wrote of Gaubil:

"More productive than Parennin and Gerbillion, less systematical than Prémare and Foucquet, more conscientious than Amiot, less light-headed and enthusiastic than Cibot, he treated thoroughly, scientifically, and critically, every question he handled."

=== Publications ===
Gaubil’s publications include;

- Les Livres Sacrés De L'orient
- De la situation du Japon et de la Corée
- Observations Mathématiques, Astronomiques, Geographiques, Chronologiques Et Physiques
- Le Chou-king
- Histoire de Gentchiscan Et de Toute La Dynastie Des Mongous, Ses Successeurs Conquérans de la Chine
- Correspondance de Pékin: 1722-1759
- Traite de la chronologie chinoise, divise en trois parties

== Cartography ==
Gaubil was one of many Jesuits who undertook mapping the geographical areas around them.
