= Landsteiner (crater) =

Crater on the Moon

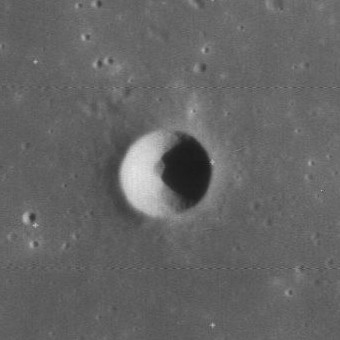
- Lunar Orbiter 4 image
- Coordinates: 31.3°N 14.8°W
- Diameter: 6 km
- Depth: 1.4 km
- Colongitude: 13° at sunrise
- Eponym: Karl Landsteiner

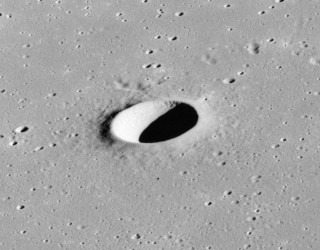
Oblique view from Apollo 15

Landsteiner is a tiny, bowl-shaped lunar impact crater in the central Mare Imbrium. It was named after Austrian-American pathologist and Nobel laureate Karl Landsteiner. It is a circular, cup-shaped feature with no appreciable erosion. Nearby to the south is a low wrinkle ridge named the Dorsum Grabau. Farther south is the prominent crater Timocharis.

This feature was identified as Timocharis F before being renamed by the IAU.
