= Xavier Ehrenbert Fridelli =

Austrian Jesuit missionary and cartographer

Xavier Ehrenbert Fridelli (11 March 1673 – 4 June 1743) was an Austrian Jesuit missionary and cartographer in China.

== Life ==
Born in Linz, Austria, Fridelli entered the Society of Jesus in 1688 and in 1705 arrived in China. Fridelli was an important contributor to the cartographical survey of the Chinese empire, begun in 1708 and completed in 1718 (according to others, 1715).

Baron Richthofen says this is "the most comprehensive cartographic feat ever performed in so short a space of time". Together with Jean-Baptiste Régis, Pierre Jartoux, and others, he designed the maps of Zhili, the Amur district, Khalkas (Mongolia), Sichuan, Yunnan, Guizhou, and Huguang (Hunan and Hubei), for which purpose the traversed the whole empire from south to north.

At the time of his death, Fridelli had been rector for many years of the Southern or Portuguese church (Nantang), one of the four Jesuit churches at Beijing, where he died. He was buried in the Jesuits' Zhalan Cemetery in Beijing.
