= Roman Hinderer =

German Jesuit missionary

Roman Hinderer (in Chinese called De Manuo 德瑪諾) (21 September 1668 – 24 August 1744) was a German Jesuit missionary in imperial China.

== Biography ==
Hinderer was born at Reiningen, near Mülhausen in Alsace (in what is now France), and died at Shang-ho, in Jiangnan.

On 6 September 1688, Hinderer joined the Society of Jesus and became a member of the German province, whence he went to China in 1707. Here the Kangxi Emperor invited him by personal request to collaborate in the great map and chart work in which the Jesuits, acting under imperial instructions, were then engaged. He laboured with Anne-Marie de Mailla and Jean-Baptiste Régis on the mapping of the provinces of Henan, Jiangnan, Zhejiang and Fujian.

In addition to his scientific endeavors, Hinderer worked as a missionary for forty years. He was twice placed at the head of the mission as canonical visitor. He particularly encouraged the devotion to the Sacred Heart.
