= Zizhi Tongjian Gangmu =

The Zizhi Tongjian Gangmu (資治通鑑綱目, "Outline and Details of the Comprehensive Mirror in Aid of Government"), also known as the Tongjian Gangmu or Gangmu, is an 1172 Chinese history book based on Sima Guang's 1084 book Zizhi Tongjian. The credited author is the neo-Confucian philosopher Zhu Xi, but its compilation was in fact by Zhu's students. In the words of J. W. Haeger, the Zizhi Tongjian Gangmu "is doubtless the most influential piece of historical writing in the later Imperial age".

The book is sometimes described as a condensed version of Zizhi Tongjian, but it's in fact historical criticism containing copious didactic and ideological rhetoric. The book was later translated into Manchu as the Tung Giyan G'ang Mu (ᡨᡠᠩ
ᡤᡳᠶᠠᠨ
ᡬᠠᠩ
ᠮᡠ) upon the request of the Kangxi Emperor of the Qing. This Manchu version was itself translated into French by the Jesuit missionary Joseph-Anna-Marie de Moyriac de Mailla. His twelve-volume translation, the Histoire générale de la Chine..., was published posthumously from 1777 to1783.

== See also ==
- Khâm định Việt sử Thông giám cương mục (欽定越史通鑑綱目)
