= Anne de Guigné =

French girl for Roman Catholic Sainthood

Venerable Anne de Guigné
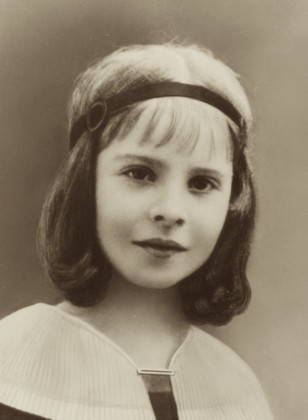
- Photograph of Anne de Guigné
- Born: 25 April 1911; Annecy-le-Vieux, Haute-Savoie, France
- Died: 14 January 1922 (aged 10); Cannes, Alpes-Maritimes, France
- Resting place: Cannes, France

Anne de Guigné (25 April 1911 – 14 January 1922) was a young French girl. In the reputation of holiness, she was declared venerable by Pope John Paul II on 3 March 1990.

== Life ==
Anne was the oldest of four siblings. Her parents were wealthy and prominent. Anne's father was Count Jacques de Guigné, second lieutenant in the 13th Battalion, Chambéry of Chasseurs Alpins. Anne's mother was born Antoinette de Charette on 19 September 1886, the great-niece of François de Charette, the well-known general who led the soldiers of France in the Battle of Patay. Anne's maternal great-grandmother, Louise de Bourbon, comtesse de Vierzon was the natural child of Ferdinand Duke de Berry, the second son of French King Charles X, making her a direct descendant of Louis XIII, XIV and XV as well; her maternal grandmother, Francoise Eulalie Marie Madeleine de Bourbon-Busset, was a direct descendant of the sixth son of King Louis IX of France, Robert, Count of Clermont.

Anne was the oldest of four children, and up until the age of four, was seen as a jealous and proud girl. On 29 July 1915 Anne's father died leading an attack against the Germans in World War I. When she was informed by her mother, Anne was a changed child. With mature understanding, she told her mother that her father was up with the angels. After that day, Anne was no longer rude and jealous. Instead, she worked hard to please her mother, and became very religious.

== Death ==
Anne began to have headaches due to spinal pain, but still did her work in school. She slipped into a coma, and the doctor discovered that she had meningitis. At 5:25 am on Saturday, 14 January, 1922, Anne died peacefully.

A cause for her beatification was formally opened on 14 January 1935. She was declared venerable on 3 March 1990 by Pope John Paul II.
