= Jean Mathieu de Chazelles =

French hydrographer (1657–1710)

- Born: 24 July 1657; Lyon
- Died: 16 January 1710 (aged 52); Paris
- Known for: Measuring the Pyramids
- Awards: Member of the French Academy of Sciences
- Scientific career
- Fields: Hydrography
- Institutions: Marseille
- Notable students: Louis Feuillée

Jean Mathieu de Chazelles (24 July 1657 – 16 January 1710) was a French hydrographer born in Lyon.

He was nominated professor of hydrography at Marseille in 1685, and in that capacity carried out various coast surveys. In 1693 he was engaged to publish a second volume of the Neptune français, which was to, include the hydrography of the Mediterranean. For this purpose he visited the Levant and Egypt. When in Egypt he measured the pyramids, and, finding that the angles formed by the sides of the largest were in the direction of the four cardinal points, he concluded that this position must have been intended, and also that the poles of the earth and meridians had not deviated since the erection of those structures.

He was made a member of the French Academy of Sciences in 1695, and died in Paris on 16 January 1710.

The botanist and explorer Louis Feuillée was one of his pupils.
