= Timocharis (crater) =

Crater on the Moon

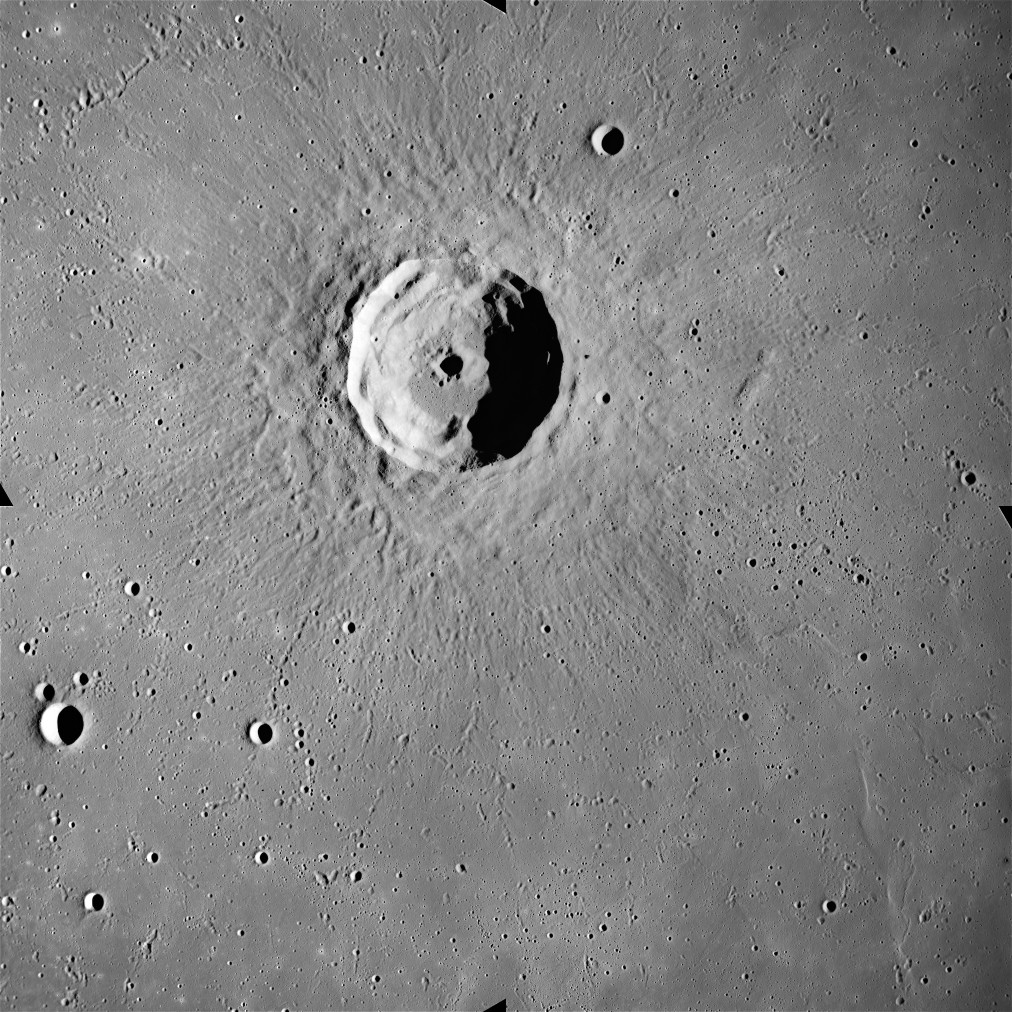
- Timocharis from Apollo 15. NASA photo.
- Coordinates: 26.7°N 13.1°W
- Diameter: 34 km
- Depth: 3.0 km
- Colongitude: 13° at sunrise
- Formation: Eratosthenian
- Eponym: Timocharis

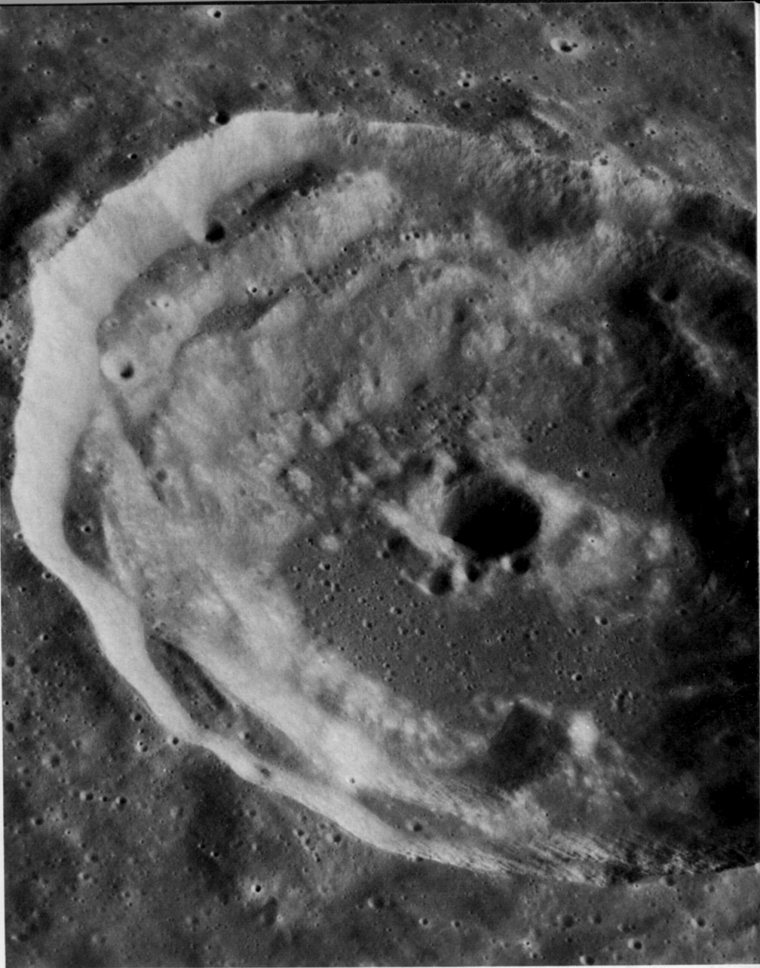
Oblique view from Apollo 17 panoramic camera. Note that the central peak has been modified by a superposed crater.

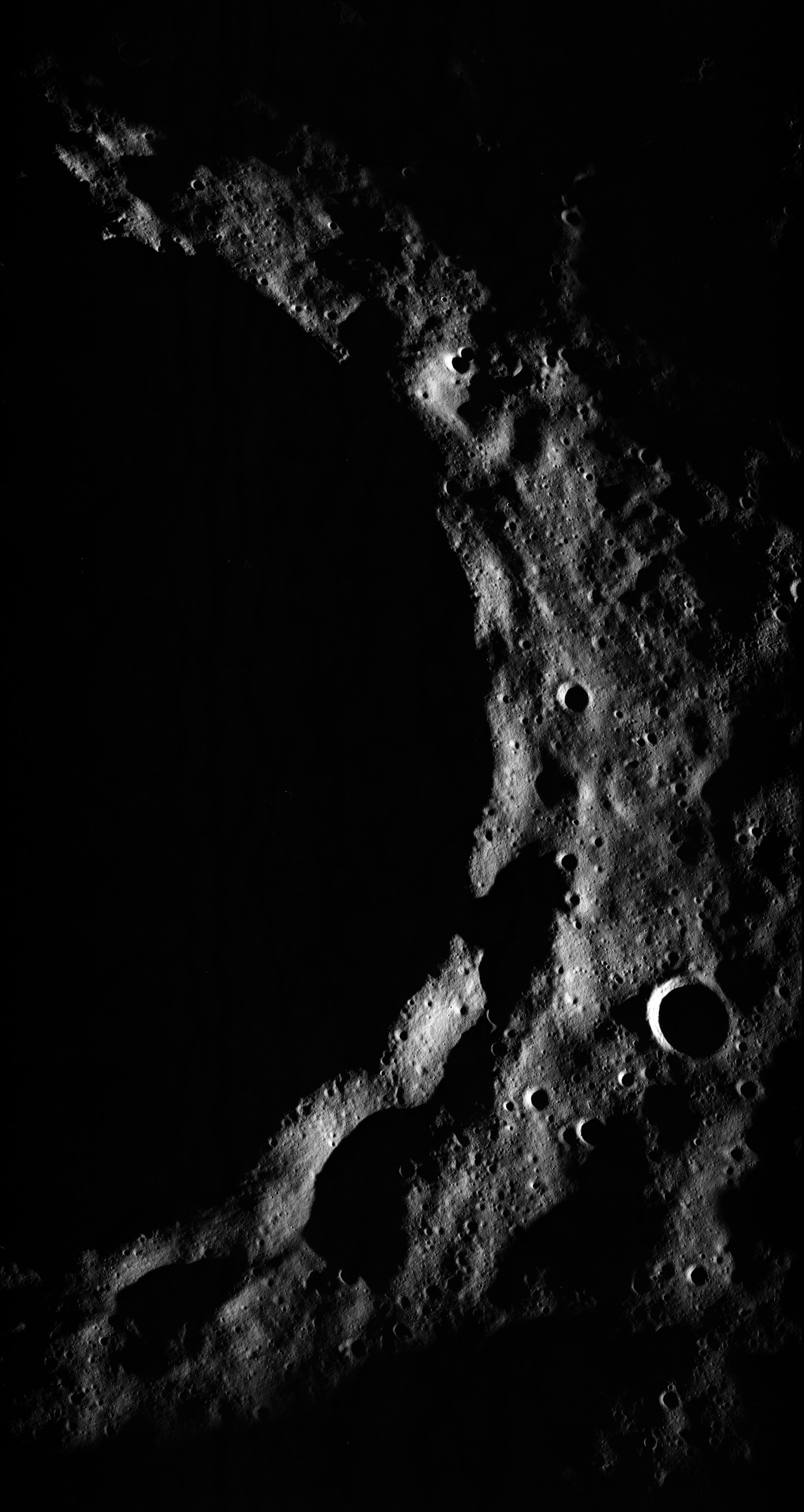
The east side of Timocharis while at the lunar terminator, from Apollo 15.

Timocharis is a prominent lunar impact crater located on the Mare Imbrium. It was named after ancient Greek astronomer Timocharis. The closest crater of comparable dimensions is Lambert to the west. The smaller craters Feuillée and Beer lie to the east of Timocharis.

The rim of Timocharis has a somewhat polygonal outline, with an outer rampart that extends over 20 kilometers in all directions. The interior wall is slumped and sharply terraced. The center of the floor is occupied by a craterlet that lies on a slight rise. This impact has almost completely removed the original central peak. The crater may have a minor ray system that extends for over 130 km (81 mi).

The crater is likely to have been formed in the Eratosthenian, between 3.2 and 1.1 Billion years ago, as it lacks a prominent ray system, but has not been significantly eroded by impacts.

Timocharis is a potential target for lunar exploration due to its young age, which may give information on the formation of central peak craters elsewhere on the lunar surface.

To the north of Timocharis is a tiny crater chain named the Catena Timocharis. THere are also a number of smaller craters in the immediate vicinity - notably Heinrich, Landsteiner, and Pupin.

== Satellite craters ==
By convention these features are identified on lunar maps by placing the letter on the side of the crater midpoint that is closest to Timocharis.

Timocharis	Latitude	Longitude	Diameter
B	27.9° N	12.1° W	33.5 km
C	24.8° N	14.2° W	33.2 km
D	23.8° N	15.1° W	32.7 km
E	24.6° N	17.1° W	32.6 km
H	23.6° N	16.6° W	32.1 km

The following craters have been renamed by the IAU.

- Timocharis A — See Heinrich (crater).
- Timocharis F — See Landsteiner (crater).
- Timocharis K — See Pupin (crater).
