= Pupin (crater) =

Crater on the Moon

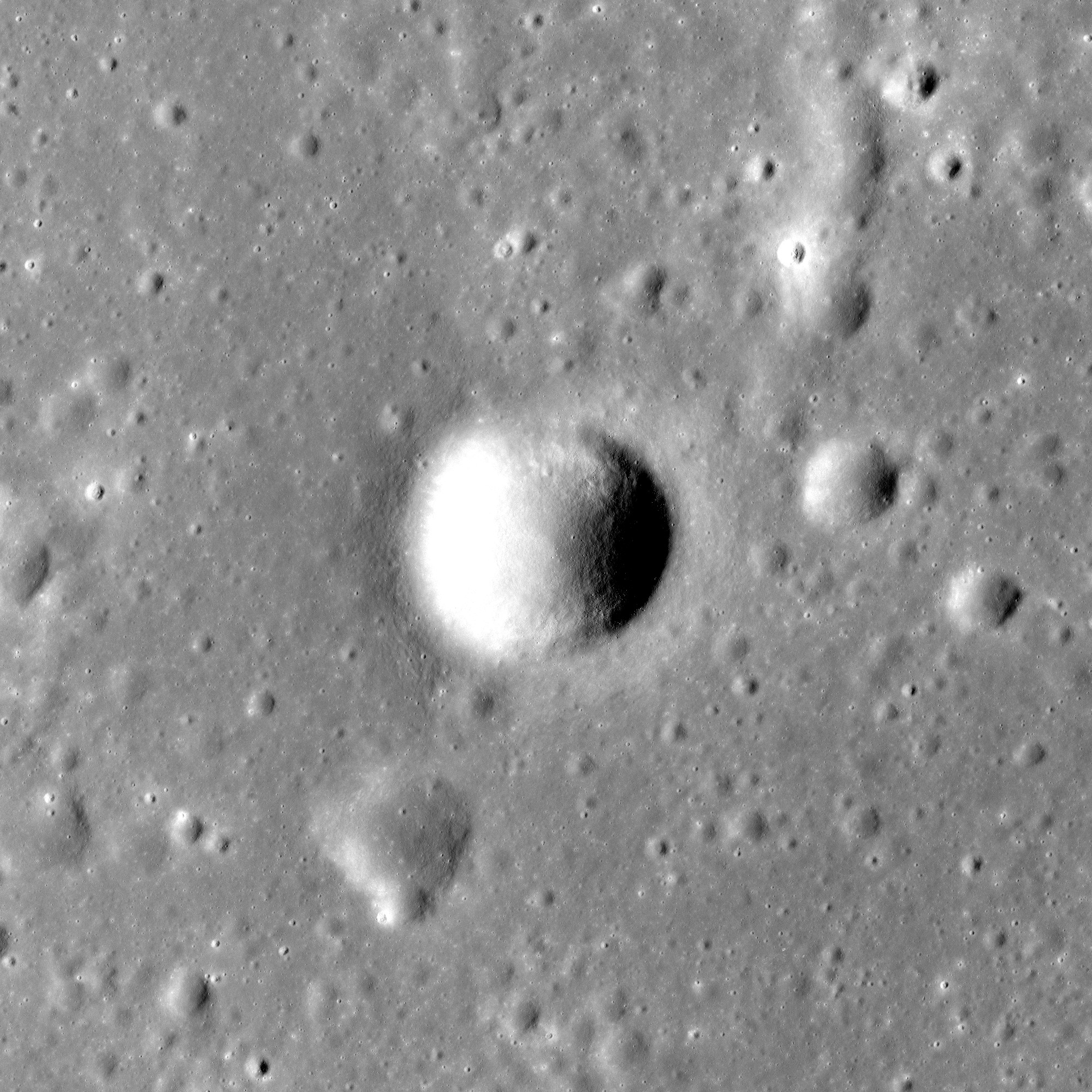
- Apollo 17 image
- Coordinates: 23.8°N 11.0°W
- Diameter: 2 km
- Depth: 0.4 km
- Colongitude: 11° at sunrise
- Eponym: Mihajlo Pupin

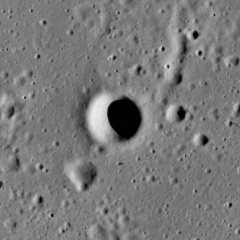
Apollo 15 image

Pupin is a tiny lunar impact crater located in the eastern part of the Mare Imbrium. It was named after Serbian-American physicist Mihajlo Pupin. It lies to the southeast of the crater Timocharis, and was identified as Timocharis K prior to being renamed by the IAU. The mare near Pupin is otherwise devoid of significant impact craters, and is nearly featureless except for a faint dusting of ray material.
