= Nicolas Fréret =

French scholar (1688–1749)

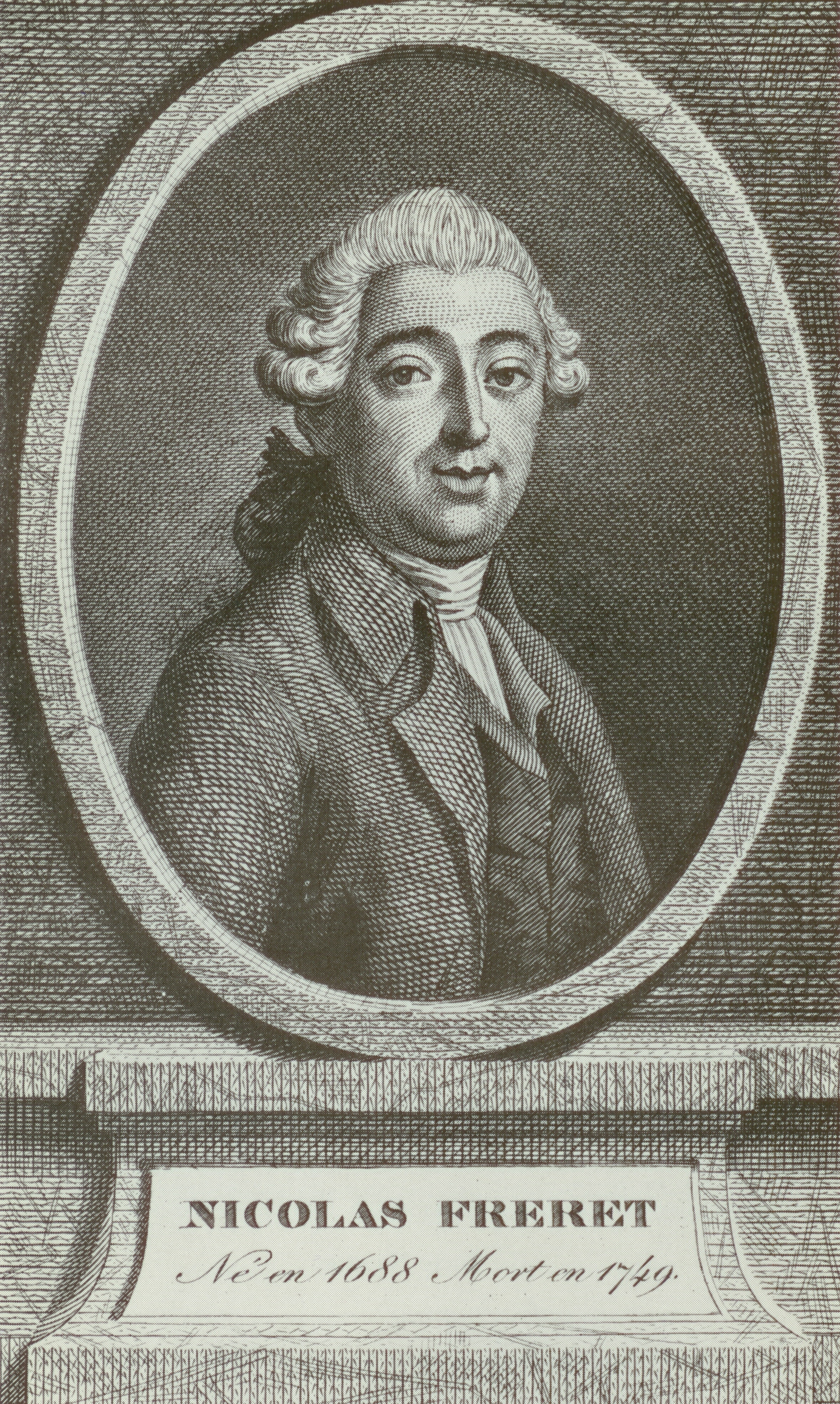
Nicolas Fréret (1688–1749).

Nicolas Fréret (French: [fʁeʁɛ]; 15 February 1688 – 8 March 1749) was a French scholar.

== Life ==
He was born in Paris on 15 February 1688. His father was procureur to the parlement of Paris, and destined him to the profession of the law. His first tutors were the historian Charles Rollin and Father Desmolets (1677–1760). Among his early studies history, chronology and mythology held a prominent place.

To please his father he studied law and began to practise at the bar; but the force of his genius soon carried him onto his own path. At nineteen he was admitted to a society of learned men before whom he read memoirs on the religion of the Greeks, on the worship of Bacchus, of Ceres, of Cybele, and of Apollo. He was hardly twenty-six years of age when he was admitted as pupil to the Academy of Inscriptions. One of the first memoirs which he read was a learned and critical discourse, Sur l'origine des Francs (1714). He maintained that the Franks were a league of South German tribes and not, according to the legend then almost universally received, a nation of free men deriving from Greece or Troy, who had kept their civilization intact in the heart of a barbarous country. These views excited great indignation in the Abbé Vertot, who denounced Fréret to the government as a libeller of the monarchy. A lettre de cachet was issued, and Fréret was sent to the Bastille.

During his six months of confinement he studied Xenophon, the fruit of which appeared later in his memoir on the Cyropaedia. From the time of his liberation in March 1715 his life was uneventful. In January 1716 he was received as associate of the Academy of Inscriptions and in December 1742 he was made perpetual secretary. He worked without intermission for the interests of the academy, not even claiming any property in his own writings, which were printed in the Recueil de l'academie des inscriptions.

== Works ==
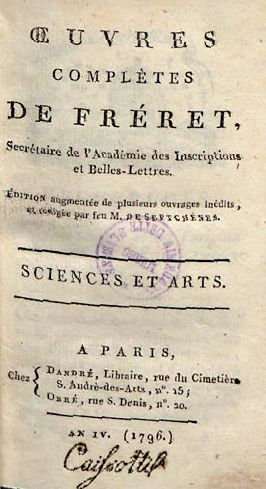
Sciences et arts, 1796

The list of his memoirs, many of them posthumous, occupies four columns of the Nouvelle Biographie générale. They treat of history, chronology, geography, mythology and religion. Throughout he appears as the keen, learned and original critic; examining into the comparative value of documents, distinguishing between the mythical and the historical, and separating traditions with an historical element from pure fables and legends. He rejected the extreme pretensions of the chronology of Egyptian origin for the Chinese civilisation and characters, and at the same time controverted the scheme of Sir Isaac Newton as too limited. He investigated the mythology not only of the Greeks, but of the Celts, the Germans, the Chinese and the Indians. He was a vigorous opponent of the theory (euhemerism) that the stories of mythology may be referred to historic originals. He also suggested that Greek mythology owed much to the Phoenicians and Egyptians.

He was one of the first scholars of Europe to undertake the study of the Chinese language, under the guidance of Arcadio Huang, a Chinese man working as translator and librarian for king Louis XIV; and in this he was engaged at the time of his committal to the Bastille. He died in Paris on 8 March 1749.

After his death several works of an atheistic character were falsely attributed to him, and were long believed to be his. The most famous of these are the Examen critique des apologistes de la religion chrétienne (1766), and the Lettre de Thrasybule à Leucippe, printed in London about 1768.

An inaccurate edition of Fréret's works was published in 1796–1799. A new and complete edition was projected by Jacques Joseph Champollion-Figeac, but of this only the first volume appeared (1825). It contains a life of Fréret. His manuscripts, after passing through many hands, were deposited in the library of the institute. The best account of his works is Examen critique des ouvrages composes par Fréret in C. A. Walckenaer's Recueil des notices, &c. (1841–1850). See also Quérard's France litteraire.
