= Louis Fan =

Louis Fan may refer to:

- Louis Fan (convert) (樊守義; 1682–1753), Chinese convert to Catholicism and first Chinese witness to report on modern Europe
- Louis Fan (actor) (樊少皇; born 1973), Hong Kong actor and martial artist
