= François Noël (missionary) =

Flemish Christian missionary to China (1651–1729)

François Noël, SJ (18 August 1651 – 17 September 1729) was a Flemish Jesuit, poet, dramatist, and missionary to the Qing Empire. Nöel unsuccessfully testified in support of Chinese converts to Catholicism retaining ancestral veneration during the Chinese Rites controversy but also opposed incorporating other elements of Confucianism into Catholic practice. He also achieved notability for translating several Chinese texts for European audiences.

== Name ==
François Noël

Wei Fangji
- Traditional Chinese: 衛方濟
- Simplified Chinese: 卫方济
Transcriptions
Standard Mandarin
- Hanyu Pinyin: Wèi Fāngjì
- Wade–Giles: Wei Fang-chi

Noël wrote his translations in Latin, in which his name appears as Franciscus Noel. He is also known by its anglicization as Francis Noel. He was known to the Chinese as Wei Fangji.

== Life ==
=== Early life ===
François Noël was a Fleming born on 18 August 1651 in Hestrud, Hainault, France. He joined the Jesuits at the age of nineteen on 30 September 1670 in Tournai, which had just been returned to France from the Spanish Netherlands two years before under the terms of the War of Devolution's Treaty of Aachen. He was a teacher of grammar and rhetoric for several years. He studied theology, mathematics, and astronomy at the University of Douai.

=== In China ===
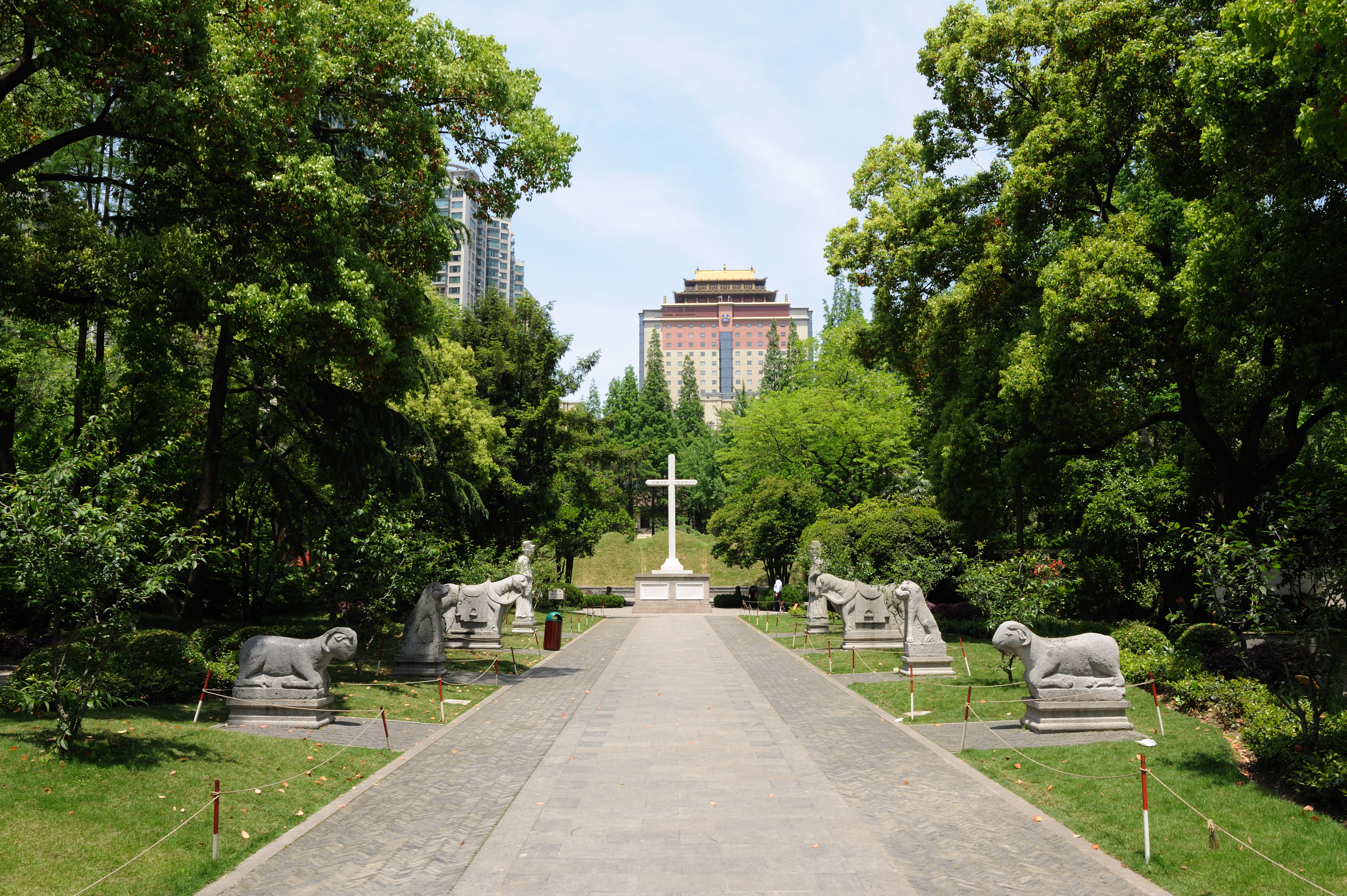
The tomb of Xu Guangqi (d. 1633) in Shanghai's Xujiahui neighborhood

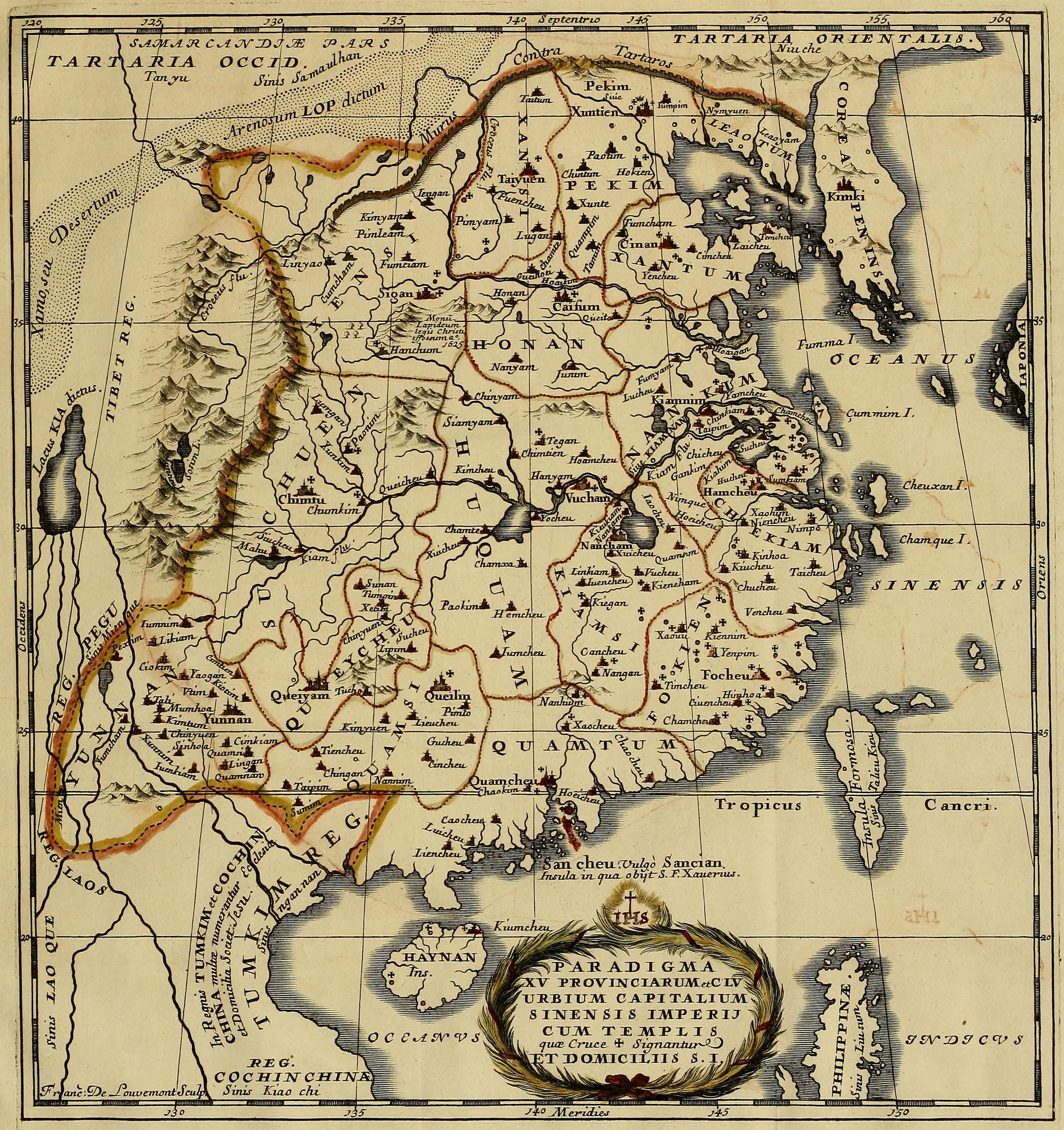
China as known to the Jesuits c. 1687.

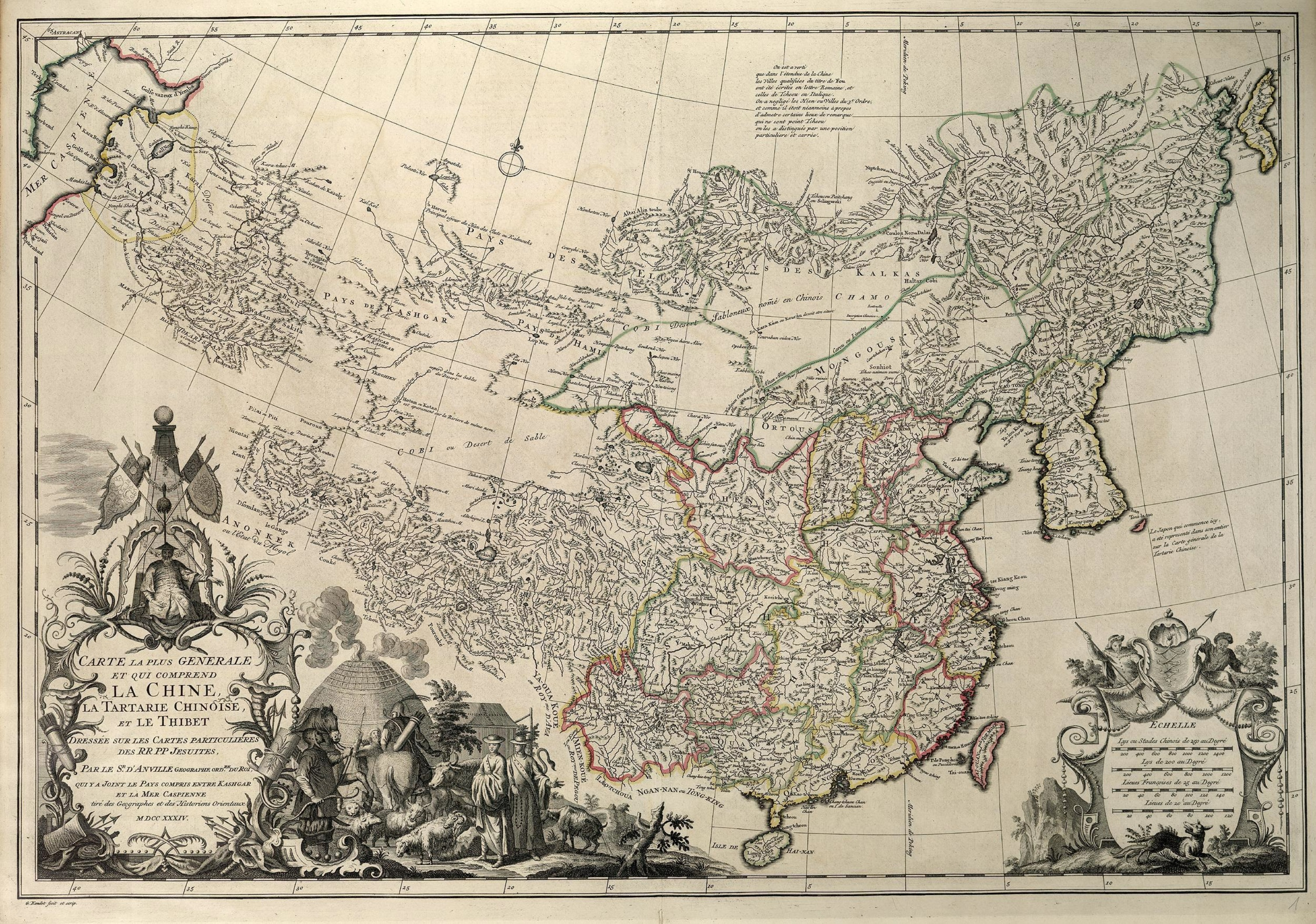
China as known to the Jesuits c. 1735.

He wanted to join the Japan mission but by this point Christianity (and European visitors generally) had been banned within the Tokugawa shogunate for many years. He nonetheless traveled to Lisbon, Portugal, and left for East Asia in January 1684. His journey was funded by Maria, the duchess of Aveiro. He hoped to get passage to Japan on a Dutch East India Company mission, but in Malacca he was assured by "Belgian Catholics from our cities" that this was impossible.

He debarked at Macau on 9 August 1685, where the return of some shipwrecked Japanese sailors caused him to hope that trade would be resumed; this was fruitless. He made his vows of poverty, chastity, obedience, and the fourth vow of "special obedience" to the pope on 2 February the next year and, after a final failed attempt to reach Japan, finally formally joined the China mission by September 1687. He is sometimes numbered among the Figurists, the Jesuit missionaries who came to think that Christianity had been the ancient religion of China, brought there by Noah's son Shem.

Noël learned rudimentary Chinese on Macau and traveled to the mainland in 1687. He traveled to Shanghai, then part of Jiangsu and—at nearby Xujiahui—the home of the family of the influential convert Xu Guangqi. After further training, he began his mission on nearby Chongming Island in early October 1688 and reported great success by August 1689: 120 baptized converts in Shanghai, 300 on Chongming, and 800 in regions dependent on Chongming.

From there, he travelled to Huai'an and Nanjing in Jiangsu; Wuhe in Anhui; Nanchang, (Note: Shortly after leaving China, Noël reported to his patron the Duchess of Aveiro that Nanchang averaged 400 converts a year during this period.) Ganzhou, Jianchang (now Fuzhou), and Nanfeng in Jiangxi; and Nan'an in Fujian.

A 1703 report to the Jesuit Provincial shows that Noël's work was primarily among the lower and working classes, especially to women and abandoned children, which left open the problem of how to pay for church construction and mission work without resorting to begging for alms in the manner of the Buddhist monks.

=== First Roman embassy ===
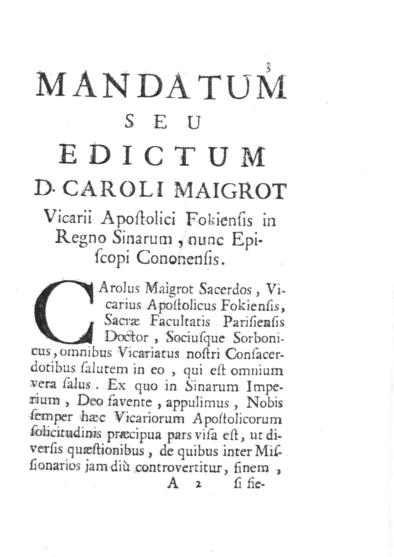
Charles Maigrot's 1693 Mandate, which reopened the Chinese Rites controversy

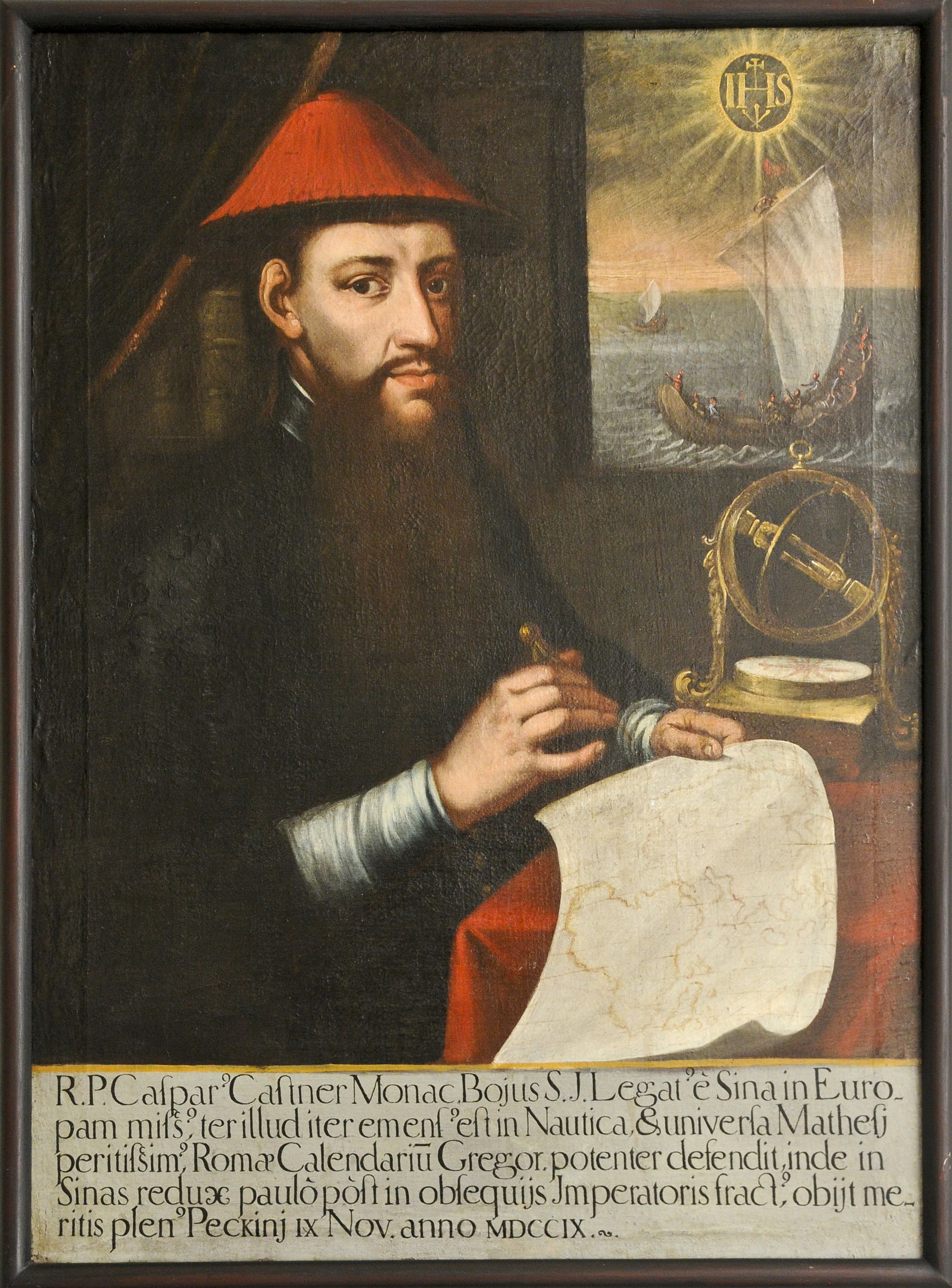
Caspar Castner, Noël's companion on his 1st embassy to Rome

On 9 November 1701, he was selected—probably through the influence of his compatriot, the Vice Provincial Superior Antoine Thomas (Note: Thomas and Noël apparently spent little time together but, apart from both being from the same area, they were both enthusiastic about reopening the Japan mission and worked together on improving the Jesuit maps of Japan, Macau, and Thailand.)—to act as the procurator for the China mission in an embassy concerning the Chinese Rites Controversy. He was to argue on behalf of the Jesuits and four Chinese bishops that the Catholic Church should continue to permit the Chinese practice with Confucian and ancestral veneration after their conversion to Christianity.

Thomas's letter reached him in Nanchang on the 25th; he left on 6 December and reached Guangzhou on 1 January. He was originally to travel with José Ramón Arxó and Claude de Visdelou, but Arxó suffered accidental delays. Visdelou, meanwhile, was delayed first owing to reticence by the French mission to allow him to leave and then under various pretexts because the visitor Carlo Turcotti (correctly) suspected his position on the question of the rites. Since there was already an English ship ready to sail, Turcotti replaced the pair with the Bavarian mathematician Caspar Castner, who was already working nearby.

The English ship departed on 14 January 1702 for Macau, which it reached on the 21st and left on the 24th. It traveled to Batavia in the Dutch East Indies (now Jakarta, Indonesia), where unbalanced cargo and heavy weather required a 17-day delay. On the journey around the Cape of Good Hope, it was again held up for almost a month because of unfavorable winds. After a 43-day wait on Saint Helena owing to fear of a new European war, the ship passed through two storms to the Azores and through a collision off Calais to London, which it reached on 4 October. The Jesuits met and presumably lobbied various ambassadors while in London, as well as the directors of the East India Company. They crossed into France on the 31st, had an audience with Philip V of Spain at Aix, and passed from Marseille to Genoa on 15 December; they finally reached Rome on the 29th or 30th.

In Rome, the pair scheduled audiences, lobbied cardinals, prepared their documents, and attended sessions at the Holy Office. They met Cardinal Fabroni, the secretary of the Congregation for the Propagation of the Faith on 10 January 1703 and Pope Clement XI two days later. On the 14th, they gave Fabroni the first round of documents: an overview, a dossier of verified testimony, books by De Rocha and Alenio, and a 1664 anti-Christian pamphlet by Yang Guangxian whose complaints proved that the Jesuits were mentioning Jesus's crucifixion to the Chinese. Some of these were rejected on various grounds, and they were forced to hire a lawyer surnamed Ursaia to present them in the proper format around March. The Franciscan Giovanni Francesco Nicolai da Leonessa had been opposing them before their arrival; on 10 March he was joined by the MEP missionary Artus de Lionne.

Despite the Noël and Castner's efforts negotiating the Roman bureaucracy over the next two years, the voluminous Chinese testimony—including an official pronouncement by the Kangxi Emperor—on the respectful but not worshipful nature of Chinese veneration, and the pains the Jesuits undertook transmitting it around the French mission in Nanjing (which supposedly intercepted it under orders from Bishop Maigrot), there is no evidence that the Roman court ever weighed any of the Jesuit evidence. Instead, despite the pope's kind words, the decision had already been reached well ahead of its formal proclamation: Charles-Thomas Maillard de Tournon had been named legate for China and the East Indies on 5 December 1701 with the specific instructions to disallow further practice of Chinese rituals by Christians there; he was given papal-like supremacy over the clerics there and, on the 27th, consecrated as the titular patriarch of Antioch, making him the notional head of the churches across most of Asia. He left for the Qing Empire aboard the French ship Maurepas on 9 February 1703, only weeks after Noël's arrival, and disallowed the Jesuit leniency towards to the Malabar rites while he waited out the monsoon season in Pondicherry. By 1704, Noël and Castner were forbidden from publishing their arguments, although their opponents were printing their treatises in great volume, and correspondence and treatises shipped from China were confiscated at Livorno. Noël seems to have accepted that there was little to be done or been otherwise occupied for the rest of the year. Castner continued his lobbying, assisted after 26 February 1704 by Jean-François de Pélisson, who arrived with further documentation from the Jesuits in China.

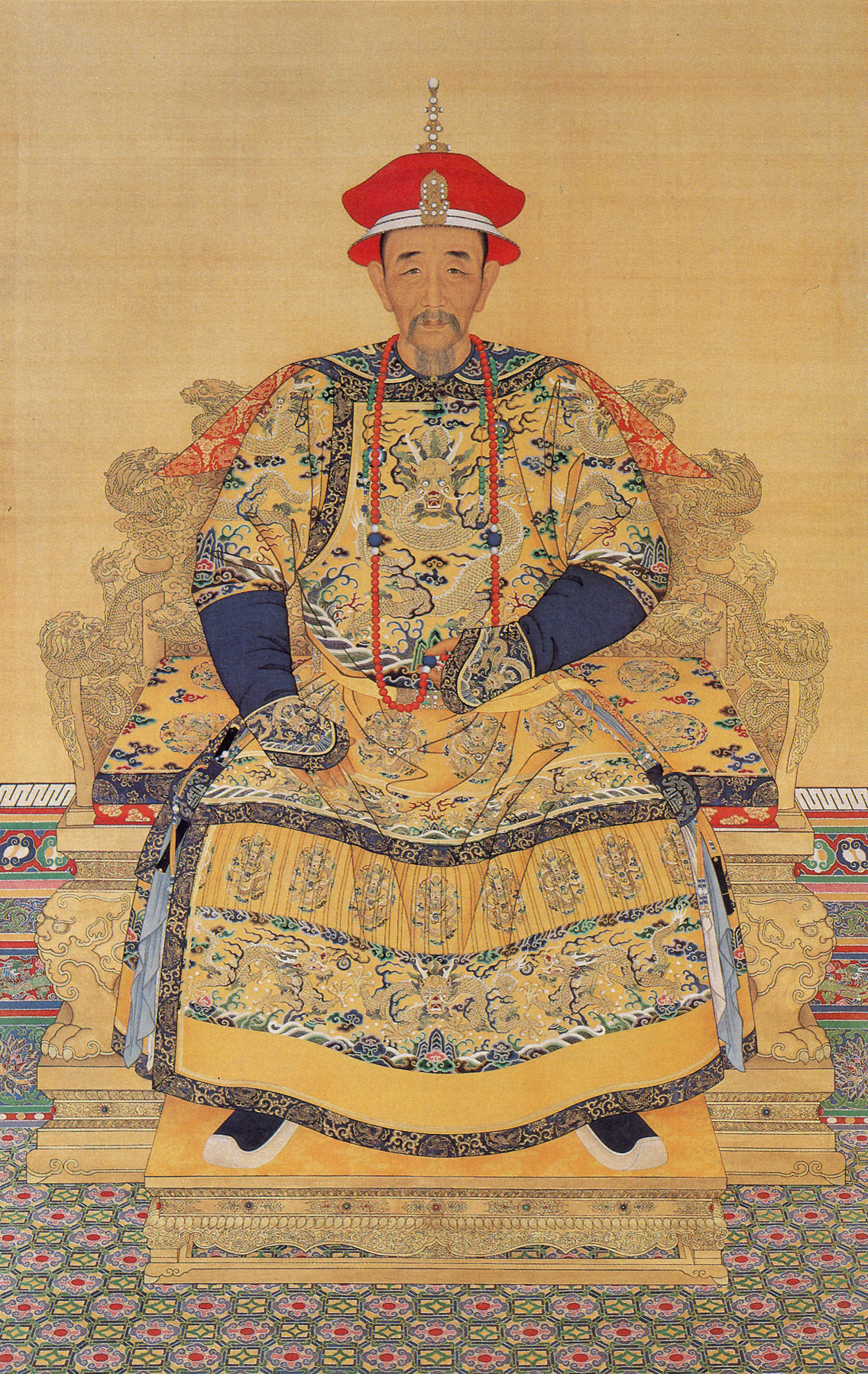
Aixinjueluo Xuanye, the Kangxi Emperor of the Qing (18th c.)

On 20 November Pope Clement XI's decree Cum Deus Optimus... ruled almost completely against the Jesuits, formalizing a ban on both the rites and further discussion of the topic. Christians could not refer to God as 天 (tiān, "Heaven" or "the sky") and their churches could not display the imperial plaque ordering parishioners to "Revere Heaven" (敬天, Jìng Tiān). Tournon was to prepare more detailed regulations to avoid "every hint of pagan superstition", and the decree was worded legalistically and carefully—"hall or temple", "sacrifice or offering"—to limit any chance the Jesuits might evade or limit its application.

Noël returned east in 1706, traveling—at Castner's insistence—not via Goa and through the Straits of Malacca but around Timor; this route proved faster and subsequently became standard for journeys between Europe and Macau. They arrived on 22 July 1707, finding the legate Tournon under arrest in Macau and the entire mission in chaos. The sickly Tournon had arrived at Macau in April 1705 and Beijing on 4 December, insisting on the incompatibility of Confucianism and Roman Catholicism. His first imperial audience the same month had been diplomatic and held out hope for permanent relations between China and the Papal States; his second, on 29 June 1706, had found the emperor displeased that any controversy had arisen over the Jesuits' accommodation of rites he had personally verified as secular and, in any case, necessary for Chinese society. Tournon—still generally uninformed on the details of the situation — had deferred to the "great expert" Maigrot, whose analysis had prompted Rome's reversal, and the emperor agreed to receive him at the new summer palace at Rehe (now Chengde). Maigrot had already been summoned from Fujian and was interviewed on 2 August 1706. Despite having lived in China since 1684, he proved so grossly ignorant — he knew only Fuzhounese and required Dominique Parrenin to translate the emperor's questions. He claimed to have read the Four Books but was unable to remember two characters from them by heart; he had not even read Matteo Ricci's Chinese catechism; and he could read only one of the four Chinese characters on the plaque behind the emperor's head but presumed to lecture the patron of the Kangxi Dictionary on the permissible meanings of the character 天;—and stubborn that he had finally been expelled from the country on 17 December and Christian missionaries required to receive an imperial permit (票, piào) attesting to their support of "the method of Matteo Ricci" and their willingness to remain in China for the rest of their lives. Finally receiving notice of Cum Deus Optimus...,

Tournon had ordered a summary and automatic excommunication of any Christian permitting Confucian rituals from Nanjing on 25 January 1707; on 7 February, he had further issued instructions concerning the piao examination—again on pain of excommunication — that precluded its ever being approved. Enraged, the emperor finally had him arrested and deported on 13 June, with the Portuguese then holding him under house arrest for their own reasons.

=== Second Roman Embassy ===
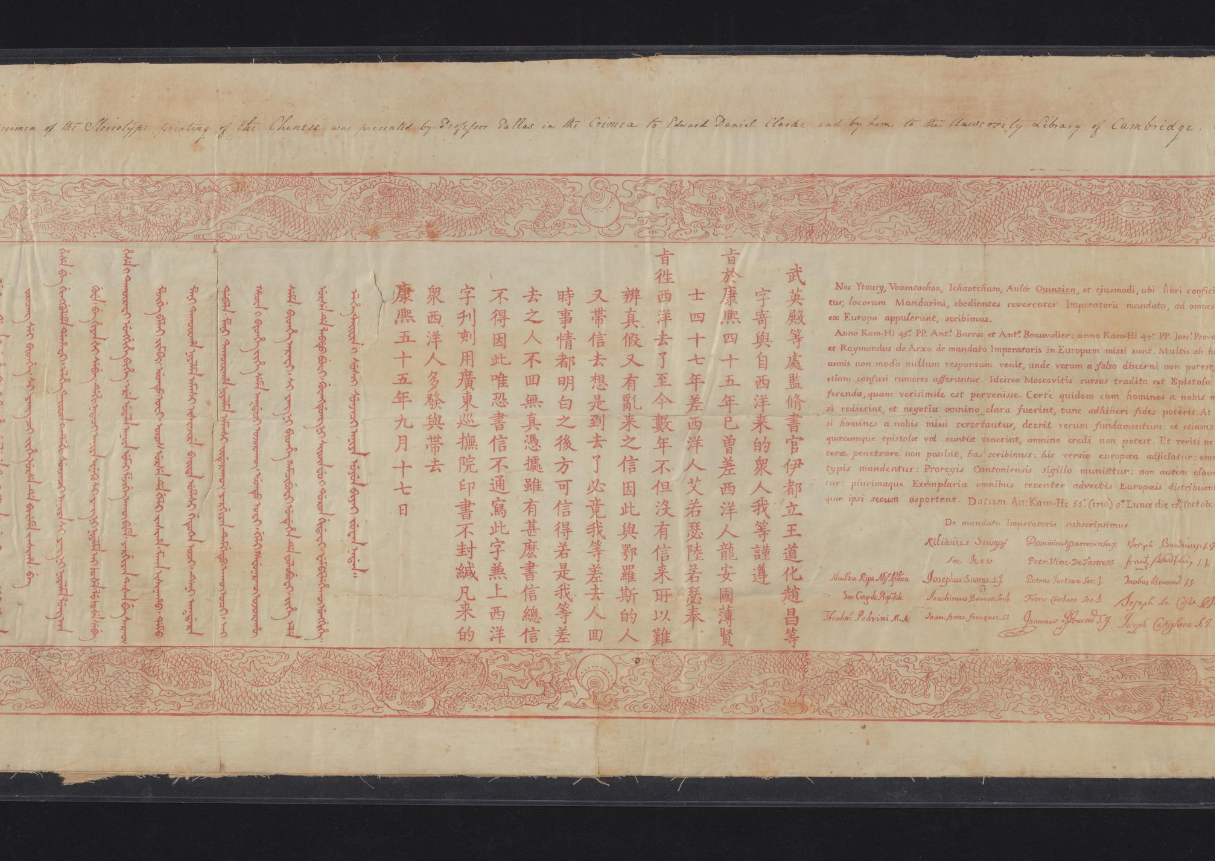
The Kangxi Emperor's 1716 open letter to Clement XI, inquiring about the fate of his 1706 and 1708 embassies

About half of the missionaries then in China joined Maigrot and Tournon in exile. At the emperor's insistence, a second embassy was dispatched to Rome to overturn Cum Deus Optimus... and Maigrot and Tournon's various rulings in 1706; this was apparently lost at sea. Unable to secure a residence permit without fear of excommunication, Noël joined a third embassy. (He has sometimes been said to have been specifically requested by the Kangxi Emperor, although this seems unlikely.)

Noël departed for Europe from Macau on 14 January 1708 on the Portuguese ship Bom Jesus de Mazagão das Brotas with the Jesuits José Ramón Arxó and António Francesco Giuseppe Provana and the Chinese convert Louis Fan. Traveling via Batavia and Bahia, Brazil, they arrived in Lisbon in September and in Rome by February the next year. En route, he sent a letter ahead to the pope imploring:

It is all up with this once flourishing mission now collapsing, and rushing to certain ruin, unless Your Holiness should please the emperor of the Chinese by a swift response, and graciously agree to his requests regarding the Chinese rites so long in dispute.

Clement supported Tournon completely. A decree from the Holy Office was issued on 25 September 1710 upholding all of his rules and condemnations. The embassy may have been enjoined from sending the Kangxi Emperor any notice of that fact, since he never learned the fate of either of his embassies; in 1716, he resorted to providing open letters (the "Red Manifesto") to passing European merchants to try to ascertain their fate. (Noël, however, was not one of those individually listed for the merchants to search for.)

=== In Europe ===
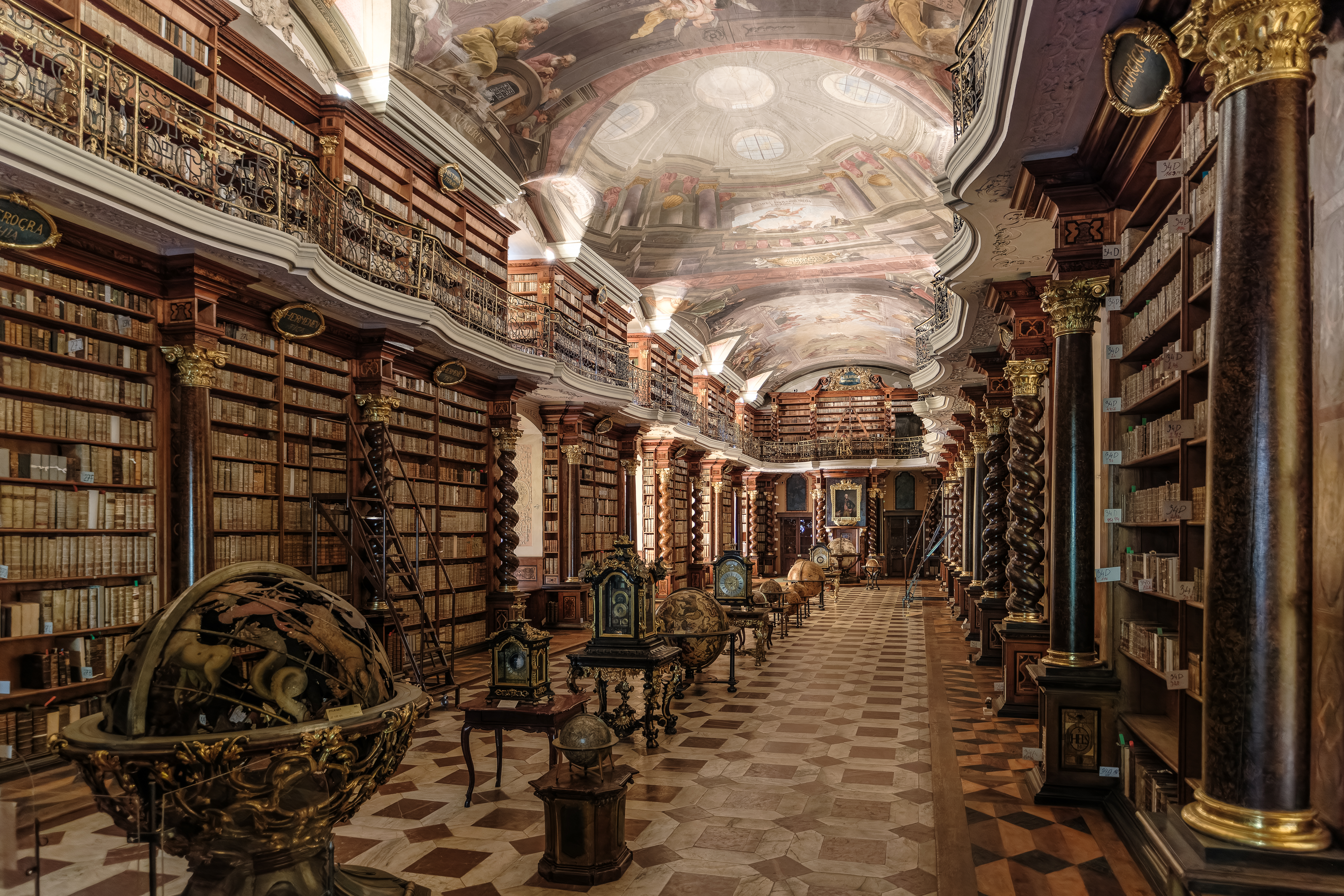
The Czech National Library, formerly the Clementinum Library of Charles-Ferdinand University, completed in the 1720s

Noël then appears to have moved to Prague, in the Austrian Empire's Kingdom of Bohemia (now the Czech Republic). There, he published mathematical and astronomical observations from India and China and lectured on mathematics at the Jesuit-staffed Charles-Ferdinand University. He also published Latin translations of classic Chinese texts and works on Sinology which he had worked over for decades. Noël's translations were banned in the Papal States and Holy Roman Empire, but were praised by Du Halde in his Description of China. They were difficult to acquire in France and western Europe but were among the most influential Jesuit works in Germany and eastern Europe, where they inspired works by Johann Benedikt Carpzov, Wilhelm von Leibnitz, and Christian Wolff, the latter of whom lost his position at the University of Halle because of his immoderate praise of Confucius and admission that the Chinese had been able to distinguish between right and wrong without exposure to Christianity. Noël's Historical Notices—which aimed to reopen the Chinese rites issue—does not seem to have been formally banned but was almost immediately suppressed. It seems likely that its claimed papal imprimatur was that which Clement had granted to publish findings before his 1704 decision; on 19 March 1715, he issued the bull Ex Illa Die... repeating in stronger terms his condemnations and the incompatibility of Chinese ritual with Catholicism.

On 10 June that year, Noël sought approval to return to China although he was 64 at the time. He was denied permission. He died on 17 September 1729 in Lille, France.

== Works ==
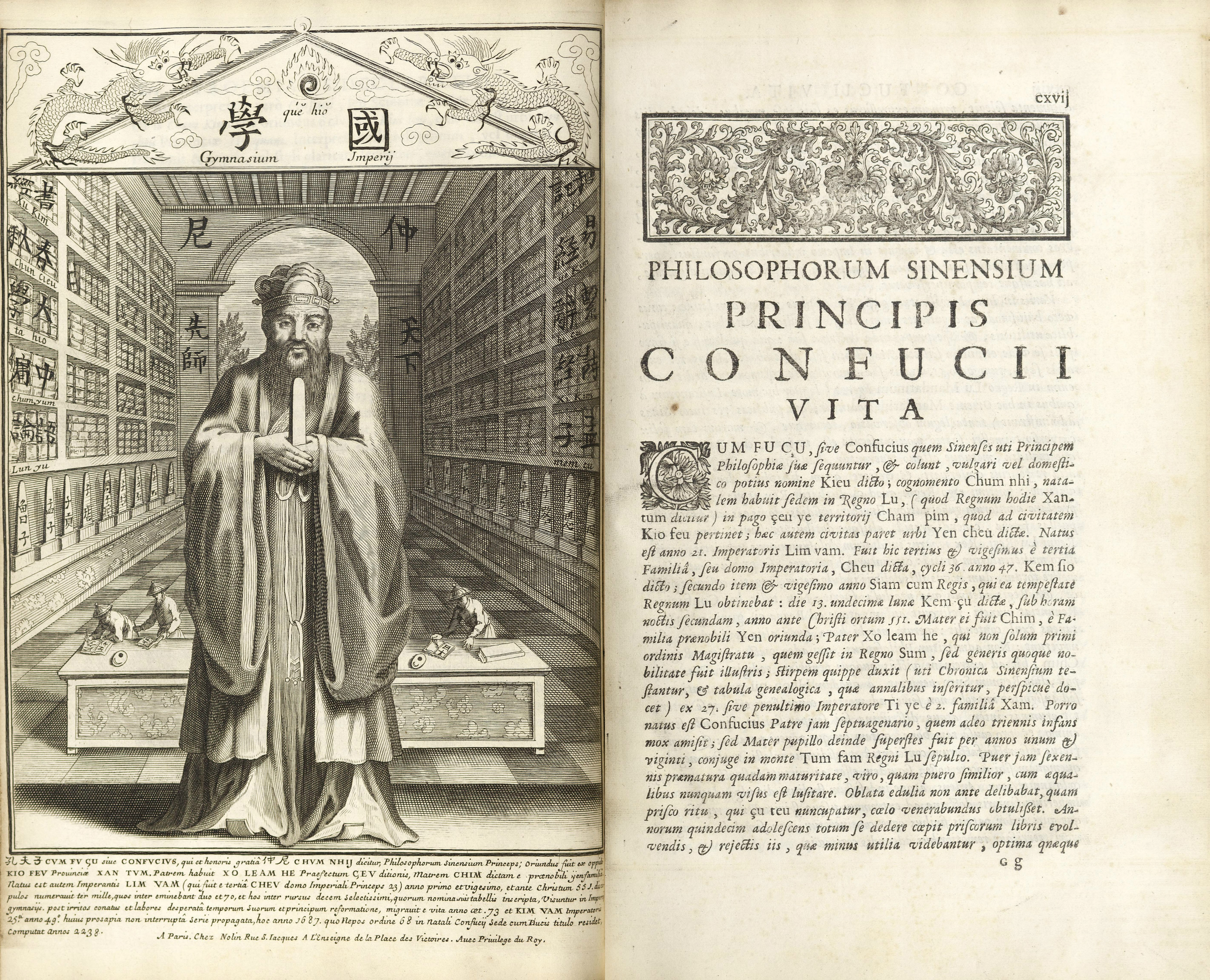
The engraving of Confucius in the 1687 Confucius, Philosopher of the Chinese. Noël's own translations had no illustrations, apart from their floral tailpieces.

Noël published his Mathematical and Physical Observations Made in India and China (Latin: Observationes Mathematicae et Physicae in India et China Factae) at the Charles-Ferdinand University's press in Prague, Bohemia (now the Czech Republic), in 1710.

Noël's effort to translate the Chinese classics was a generally scholarly one, aiming to present it more correctly on its own terms than previous Jesuit editions like the Confucius Sinarum Philosophus had, but it was still an exercise undertaken in order to further missionizing among the Chinese. The preface to his Six Chinese Classics ends with the admonition that the reader should bear the Christian life in mind while reading the volume's Chinese teachings and the hope that the work would assist in making Christ the cornerstone to every life. The Jesuits initially focused on translating Confucian classics, rather than Buddhist scriptures or the Taoist canon, because of its greater importance in Chinese officialdom under the Ming and Qing. The works of Mencius were not originally translated because Matteo Ricci disliked Mencian interpretations of the other classic texts, particularly his strong condemnation of celibacy as unfilial.

Noël published his Six Classic Books of the Chinese Empire (Sinensis Imperii Libri Classici Sex) at the same press the next year, although his manuscripts show he had been working on them since at least 1700. The six classics were the Great Learning (Latin: Adultorum Schola or Doctrina), the Doctrine of the Mean (Immutabile Medium), the Analects (Liber Sententiarum), the collected works of Mencius (Memcius), the Classic of Filial Piety (Filialis Observantia), and the Lesser Learning (Parvulorum Schola). Each of the first four are completely new translations prefaced by Zhu Xi's commentaries (t 四書集注, s 四书集注, Sìshū Jízhù). Each of the last three were the first European translations of the works. All were rather fairly freely translated from the editions established by Zhu Xi; his preface states the works are "not, so to speak, what the Chinese wrote but, I hope, what they really meant". (Note: Latin: "...non tantum ut discas, quae Sinae scripserunt, set et ut agas, quae recte senserunt...") For example, the first lines of the Doctrine of the Mean were rendered "The Law of Heaven is nature itself; the tendency of this nature is the way of acting correctly; the direction of this life is a right discipline of life, or the right precepts for living." (Note: Latin: "Caeli lex est ipsa natura; hujus naturae ductus est recta agendi via; hujus viae directio est recta vitae disciplina, seu recta vivendi praecepta...")

At the same time, he published his Three Treatises on Chinese Philosophy (Philosophia Sinica Tribus Tractatibus). Its three sections deal with "On Knowledge of the First Being or God among the Chinese" (De Cognitione Primi Entis seu Dei apud Sinas), "On the Ceremonies of the Chinese for the Dead" (De Ceremoniis Sinarum erga Denunctos), and "On Chinese Ethics" (De Ethica Sinensi). Unlike earlier Jesuit works, it does not claim that the Neo-Confucianism of Zhu Xi and others was a Buddhist corruption of Confucianism; it treats it as an organic development although still cautioning that its vague terms should not be used in reference to the Christian God.

Finally, in the same year, he also published Historical Notices of Chinese Rituals and Ceremonies in the Veneration of Deceased Parents and Benefactors. It expands on the topic of the second his Three Treatises, with many more citations from Chinese works. Combatively polemical in describing an understanding of Chinese ancestral veneration that is compatible with Catholicism, it claimed a papal imprimatur for its publishing but was almost immediately suppressed.

He published his Little Poetic Works (Opuscula Poetica) at Frankfurt in 1717. Its four parts comprise a Life of Jesus Christ under the Name of Divine Love (Vita Jesu Christi sub Nomine Divini Amoris); Marian Letters (Epistolae Marianae); a Life of St Ignatius of Loyola, Founder of the Jesuits (Vita Sancti Ignatii de Loyola Societatis Jesu Fundatoris); and several tragedies (Tragoediae), including Philotas, Herod (Herodes), Love (Amor), Lucifer, Accianus, and Henry (Henricus). An appendix includes the comedy Blind Sight (Caecus Videns).

He also published a popular theology textbook.

== See also ==
- Catholic Church in China
- Jean Joseph Marie Amiot
