= Étienne Fourmont =

- Born: 23 June 1683; Herblay, Val-d'Oise, France
- Died: 8 December 1745 (aged 62); Paris, France
- Education: Collège Mazarin
- Scientific career
- Fields: Arabic, Hebrew, Chinese
- Workplaces: Collège de France

Chinese name
- Traditional Chinese: 傅爾蒙
Transcriptions
Standard Mandarin
- Hanyu Pinyin: Fù Ěrméng

Étienne Fourmont (23 June 1683 – 8 December 1745) was a French Orientalist who served as professor of Arabic at the Collège de France and published grammars on the Arabic, Hebrew, and Chinese languages.

Although Fourmont is remembered as a pioneering sinologist who did careful and influential work on the nature of Chinese characters, his legacy is significantly tarnished by the fact that he earned his early reputation by stealing the work of Arcadius Huang, whom he had helped catalog the royal sinological collection, and that he frequently plagiarized the works of other scholars.

== Life and career ==
Born at Herblay near Argenteuil, he studied at the Collège Mazarin in Paris and afterwards in the Collège Montaigu where his attention was attracted to Oriental languages. Shortly after leaving the college he published a Traduction du commentaire du Rabbin Abraham A ben Esra sur l'Ecclésiaste.

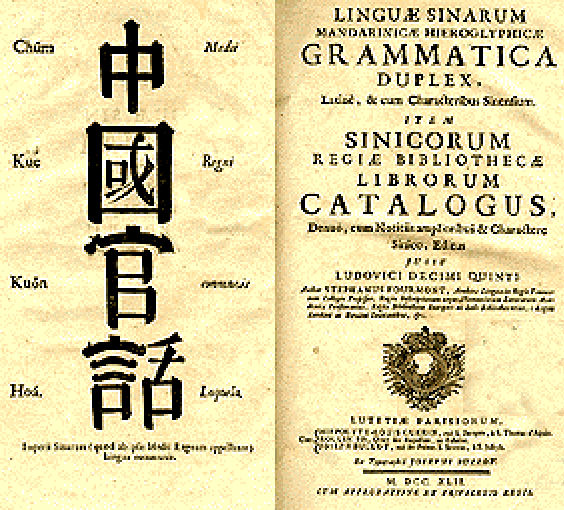
Chinese grammar by Étienne Fourmont.

In 1711 Louis XIV appointed Fourmont to assist Arcadius Huang, a Catholic Chinese convert, in cataloging the French royal collection of works in Chinese and compiling a Chinese dictionary. One day, Fourmont was discovered copying Huang's work, and after Huang's death there was suspicion that Fourmont had not given Huang adequate credit. Huang died in 1716, and Fourmont immediately appropriated his work for himself. He completed Huang's catalogue and published it in Paris in 1737 as Catalogus Codicum Manuscriptorum Bibliothecae Regiae (Royal Library Catalog of Manuscripts). He also wrote Réflexions critiques sur les histoires des anciens peuples (1735), and several dissertations printed in the Memoires of the Academy of Inscriptions. Fourmont's most notable work was his 1737 grammar of Chinese: Linguae Sinarum mandarinicae hieroglyphicae grammatical duplex patine et cum characteribus Sinensium. This work is simply a copy of Francisco Varo's earlier Chinese grammar, with the addition of Chinese characters.

He became professor of Arabic in the Collège de France in 1715. In 1713 he was elected a member of the Academy of Inscriptions, in 1738 a member of the Royal Society of London, and in 1742 a member of that of Berlin. He died at Paris on 8 December 1745.

His brother, Michel Fourmont (1690–1746), was also a member of the Academy of Inscriptions, and professor of the Syriac language in the Royal College.

== Selected works ==
- --, Les Racines De La Langue Latine, Mises En Vers François (Paris: Chez Pierre-Augustin Le Mercier, 1706)
- --, Examen Pacifique De La Querelle De Madame Dacier Et De Monsieur De La Motte Sur Homere. (Paris: Chez Jacques Rollin, 1716). Reprinted: Geneva: Slatkine Reprints, 1971.
- --, Meditationes Sinicae: In Quibus 1. Consideratur Linguae Philosophicae Atque Universalis Natura Qualis Esse, Aut Debeat, Aut Possit. : 2. Lingua Sinarum Mandarinica Tum in Hieroglyphis Tum in Monosyllabis Suis ... Ostenditur : 3. Datur Eorumdem Hieroglyphorum Ac Monosyllaborum Atque Inde Characterum Linguae Sinicae Omnium ... Lectio & Intellectio ... : 4. Idque Omne, Progressu a Libris Mere Europaeis (De Sinica Tamen) Ad Libros Mere Sinicos, Facto (Lutetiae Parisiorum: Chez Musier le Père ... Jombert ... Briasson ... Bullot ; ex typographia Bullot, 1737). GOOGLE BOOK
- --, Lingua Sinarum Mandarinicae Hieroglyphicae Grammatica Duplex, Latine Et Cum Characteribus Sinensium. Item Sinicorum Regiae Bibliothecae Librorum Catalogus (Lutetia Parisorum, 1742). Download or view: Bayerische StaatsBibliotek digital
- --, Joseph de Guignes, Michel-Ange-André Le Roux Deshauterayes, Jean Debure, Reflexions Sur L'origine, L'histoire Et La Succession Des Anciens Peuples, Chaldeens, Hebreux, Pheniciens, Egyptiens, Grecs, &C., Jusqu'au Tems De Cyrus Nouvelle Edition, Augmentée De La Vie De L'auteur, & D'une Table Alphabétique Des Matieres (A Paris, chez De Bure l'aîné, quai des Augustins, à l'Image S. Paul. M. DCC. XLVII., 1747).

== References and further reading ==
- App, Urs (2010). The Birth of Orientalism. Philadelphia: University of Pennsylvania Press., esp. "Fourmont's Dirty Little Secret" (pp. 191- 197).
- Honey, David B. (2001). Incense at the Altar: Pioneering Sinologists and the Development of Classical Chinese Philology. American Oriental Series 86. New Haven, Connecticut: American Oriental Society. ISBN 0-940490-16-1.,
- Leung, Cécile (2002). Etienne Fourmont, 1683–1745 : Oriental and Chinese Languages in Eighteenth-Century France. (Leuven: Leuven University Press; Ferdinand Verbiest Foundation, Leuven Chinese Studies). ISBN 9058672484. GOOGLEBOOK
- Authority Page WorldCat
- Cordier, Henri (1886). Notes Pour Servir À L'histoire Des Études Chinoises En Europe, Jusqu'à L'époque De Fourmont L'aîné. Leiden?: Brill?.
