= Chinese diaspora in France =

Ethnic group in France

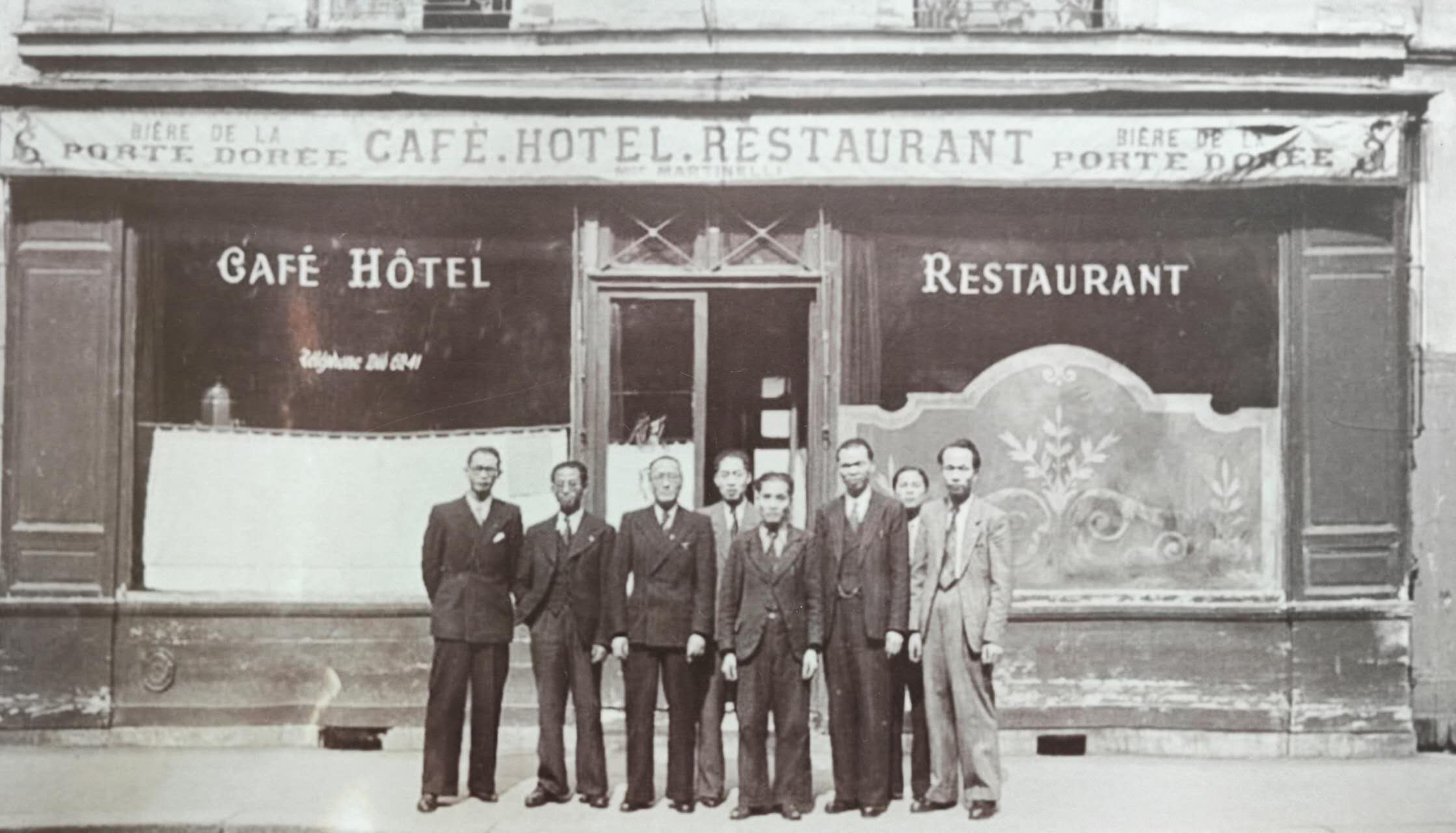
- A group of Chinese men from Qingtian in France, early 20th century

Total population
- c. 600,000 (2024); 0.9% of the French population 116,000 Chinese citizens (2023)

Regions with significant populations
- Paris region (Quartier asiatique), Lyon (Note: According to INSEE, 70,998 live in the Paris region as of 2018.)

Languages
- French, Chinese (Wenzhounese, Qingtian dialect, Teochew, Cantonese, Mandarin), some Vietnamese

Religion
- Irreligion, Buddhism, Taoism, Confucianism, Christianity (Catholicism)

Related ethnic groups
- Overseas Chinese

Chinese French

Chinese name
- Traditional Chinese: 法國華人
- Simplified Chinese: 法国华人
Transcriptions
Standard Mandarin
- Hanyu Pinyin: Fàguó Huárén
Yue: Cantonese
- Yale Romanization: Faatgwok Wàyàn

Alternative Chinese name
- Traditional Chinese: 法國華僑
- Simplified Chinese: 法国华侨
Transcriptions
Standard Mandarin
- Hanyu Pinyin: Fàguó Huáqiáo
Yue: Cantonese
- Yale Romanization: Faatgwok Wàkìu

French name
- French: Chinois en France

The Chinese diaspora in France includes people of Chinese origin who were born in or immigrated to France. Chinese constituted the second largest Asian group in France, with a population of roughly 600,000 as of 2024. The country is home to Europe's largest Overseas Chinese population. Uniquely among most overseas Chinese communities, a significant portion of ethnic Chinese immigrants and their descendants in France originate from Southeast Asia instead of China, namely the former colonies of French Indochina which consist of modern-day Vietnam, Laos, and Cambodia.

== History ==
=== 17th century ===
The first record of a Chinese man in France is Shen Fo-tsung in 1684, and soon after Arcade Huang, also known as Huang Jialüe (1679–1716). He was brought back by Jesuit missionaries to the Versailles court of Louis XIV, the Sun King in the late 17th century, and oversaw a collection of manuscripts sent as a gift from the Kangxi Emperor of Qing China.

=== Belle Époque ===
The opening of Wenzhou, the primary harbour of Southern Zhejiang as a treaty port in 1876 soon saw a small number of merchants from the region arriving in Paris, being the first wave of Chinese settlement in France. Among these early migrants were itinerant merchants from the mountainous county of Qingtian, particularly those engaged in selling Qingtian stone carvings. The 1911 census counted 283 Chinese in France. This tiny Chinese population during the Belle Époque period mainly consisted of students, journalists, intellectuals, as well as merchants. Many students of Chinese ethnicity in France were not from China but rather Vietnam, which was a French colony with a significant Chinese population.

In 1902, Li Shizeng and Zhang Jingjiang arrived in Paris as "embassy students" accompanying Ambassador to France Sun Baoqi. Li soon left this official position to study biology at Ecole Pratique d'Agriculture du Chesnoy in Montargis, a town 120 kilometres south of Paris. He founded the first factory which manufactured beancurd for the French market. Zhang established a Paris gallery which sold Chinese art. Together with their friend Wu Zhihui, they formed the French branch of the Chinese anarchist movement which drew inspiration from French anarchists. In 1909, the three arranged for 140 students to come from China to work in the beancurd factory in order to support their study of French language and culture. Over the next two decades, Li, Zhang, and Wu established a number of institutions of Sino-French friendship such as the Diligent Work-Frugal Study Movement. Also arriving in Paris at this time was the art-dealer C.T. Loo, who married a French woman and maintained a business there until the 1950s.

=== World War I ===
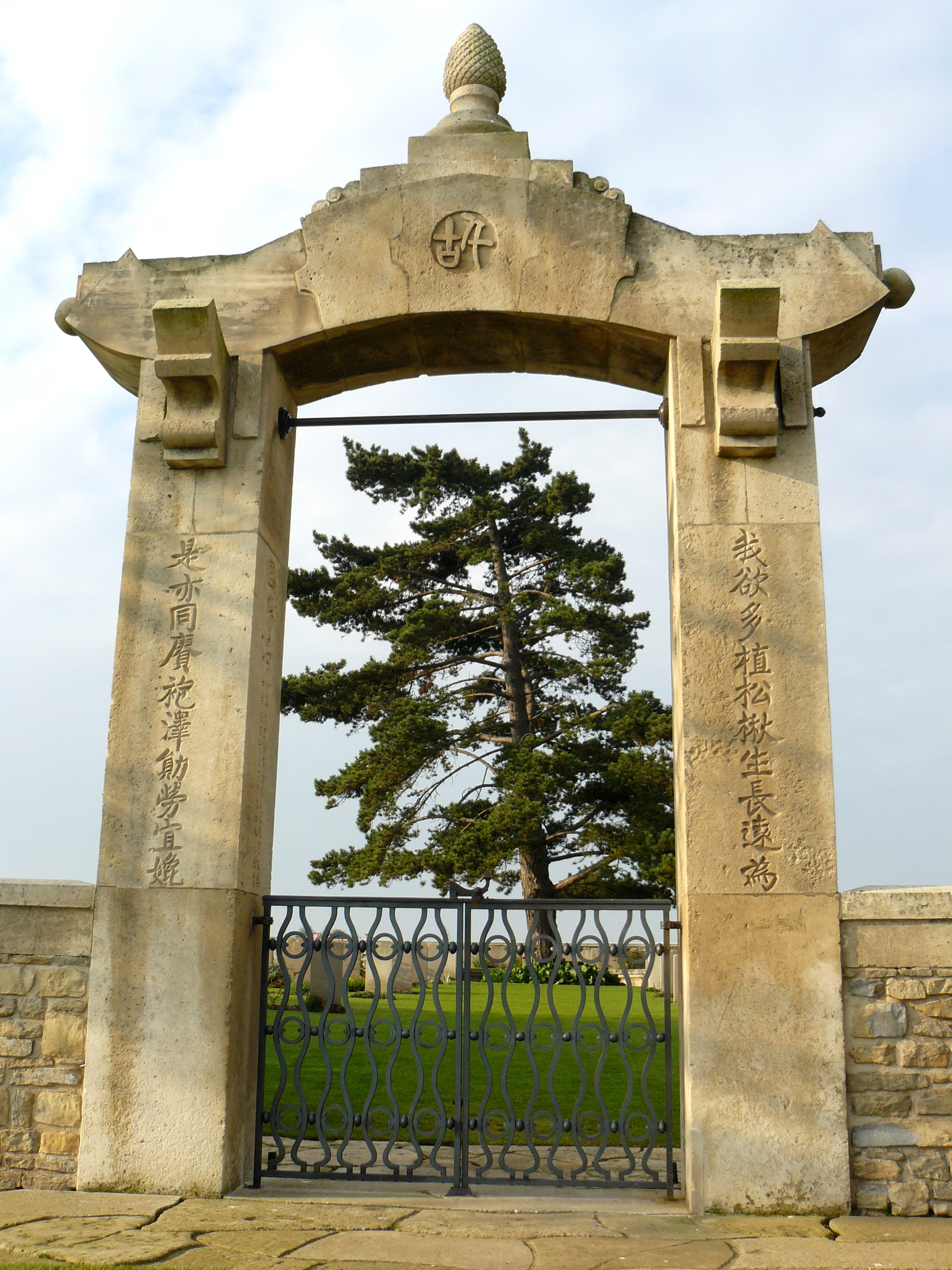
The entrance of the WWI Chinese cemetery at Noyelles-sur-Mer

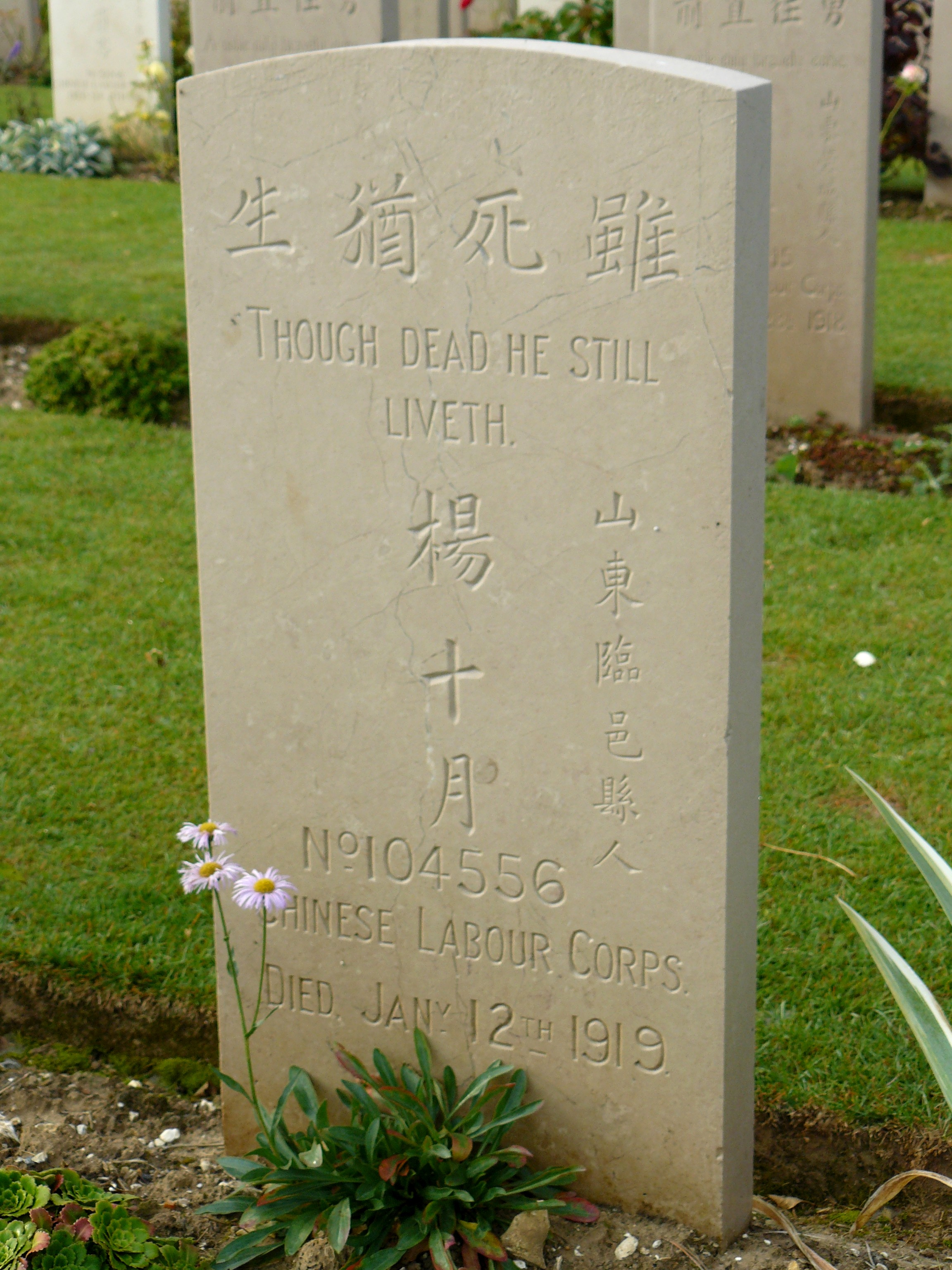
A tomb in the WWI Chinese cemetery at Noyelles-sur-Mer

Between 1915 and 1916, with the World War I conflict at its height between the allies and the Central Powers of Germany and Austro-Hungary, the British recruited more than 100,000 Chinese (Chinese Labour Corps) and their French allies some 40,000, and shipped them to the French western front as desperately needed labour to relieve an acute manpower shortage. They cleared mines, repaired roads and unloaded ships, with their contribution going unrecognized for decades. Mainly aged between 20 and 35 and hailing from the northern Chinese provinces of Hebei, Jiangsu and particularly Shandong, as well as Wenzhou, they served as labour in the rear echelons or helped build munitions depots, repair railways and roads, and unloaded ships at Allied ports. Some worked in armaments factories, others in naval shipyards, for a pittance of three to five francs a day. At the time they were seen just as cheap labour, not even allowed out of camp to fraternise locally, dismissed as mere coolies. When the war ended some were used for mine clearance, or to recover the bodies of soldiers and fill in miles of trenches.

After the Armistice, the Chinese, each identified only by an impersonal reference number, were shipped home. Only about 2,000 to 3,000 stayed on, forming the nucleus of the later Chinese community in Paris. Most who survived returned to China in 1918. However, some were trapped in France by the 30 June 1920 collapse of the Banque industrielle de Chine. An estimated ten thousand died in the war effort, victims of either shelling, landmines, poor treatment or the worldwide Spanish flu epidemic of 1918. Their remains still lie in 30 French graveyards, the largest at Noyelles-sur-Mer on the Somme, where some of the fiercest battles occurred. The cemetery contains 842 gravestones each engraved with Chinese characters, guarded by two stone lions, gifts from China.

After decades of neglect, the Chinese World War I labourers were ceremoniously recognized for their effort. An annual ceremony of tribute has taken place since 2002 at the cemetery at Noyelles-sur-Mer each April to coincide with the Chinese Festival of Qingming, attended by representatives of the French veterans' associations, the Chinese ambassador to France and members of Chinese associations in France. A 2004 documentary film, "Journey With no Return," (Voyage sans retour), was shown on French television.

=== Post World War I ===
Chinatown, Paris

Of the 2,000 to 3,000 Chinese who remained in France after World War I, most became factory workers and settled around the Île-de-France region, especially in Boulogne-Billancourt. The presence of the larger and more established Vietnamese community in France had an effect in helping the Chinese settle down and jointly form the first significant Asian presence in France. The first rooted Chinese community in Paris was based first around the Gare de Lyon in the east of the capital, then near the Arts et Métiers metro station in the 3rd arrondissement.

Since 1919, the number of Chinese in France was slightly bolstered by an influx of students from both French Indochina and China, (including Zhou Enlai, who would later become the Premier of the People's Republic of China and Deng Xiaoping, later de facto leader of China), who would play a crucial leadership role in organising community institutions for the Chinese there.

In the 1930s and 1940s, Chinese from Wenzhou settled in Paris (as well as in many other European cities such as Madrid, Frankfurt, Florence, and Milan). They worked as leatherworkers near the Jewish neighborhood in the 3rd arrondissement and setting up sundries and mini-markets. Taking over the wholesale trade lost by the Jews during the German occupation of France during World War II, the Chinese community continues to exist today.

=== Recent immigration ===
==== Vietnamese Chinese ====
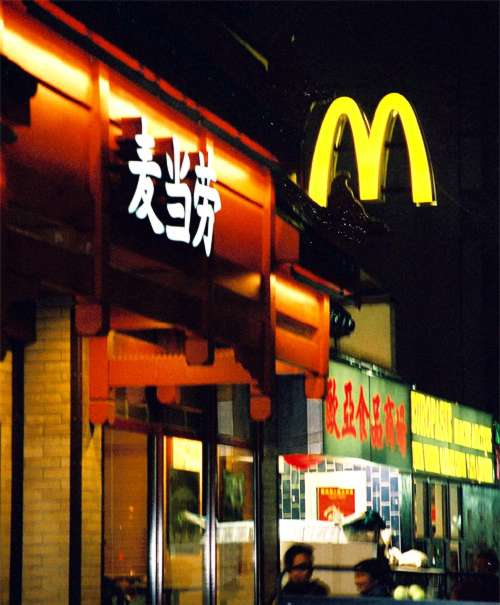
Chinese and American cultural influences in Paris

After the Fall of Saigon in 1975, ethnic Chinese from Vietnam were heavily persecuted by the new communist government and faced expulsion from the newly reunified country. This led to a wave of emigration to France, as Vietnamese Chinese joined other ethnic Vietnamese refugees from South Vietnam and largely resettled in Paris and the surrounding Île-de-France region. Ethnic Chinese from Laos and Cambodia, the other two former French Indochina colonies, also arrived in France after this period of conflict for similar reasons.

During the period, the high-rise neighbourhood in the southeast of Paris' 13th arrondissement, where the city's Quartier Asiatique (Asian Quarter) is located, saw significant population growth. The area contains many Chinese inhabitants predominantly living in high-rise apartments, in addition to large Vietnamese and Laotian communities. Similar to the ethnic Vietnamese population, Chinese refugees from Vietnam who migrated to France and French-speaking regions of Canada on average had a higher level of affluence and are better integrated into the host nation than their peers who migrated to North America or Australia.

==== Other new immigrants ====
Since the 1980s, immigration has increased steadily, with the main source countries being mainland China, notably from Wenzhou, in addition to the countries of former French Indochina. More recently, Chinese immigration to France has shifted to migrants from the northeast of the mainland. In Paris, settlement is spread across both urban and suburban districts, notably the 13th arrondissement, and the Templetowns of Lognes, Torcy, Noisy-le-Grand. Lyon and Marseille also have significant Chinese communities.

Immigration from China to France slowed considerably in the 2010s and the 2020s, with growth falling below that of all other immigrants. The number of Chinese nationals holding a first residence permit halved between 2013 and 2021, leading China to fall from 3rd to 8th place in the ranking of countries whose nationals are admitted for residence.

== Cultural profile ==
The Chinese community in France can be categorized into three different groups based on migrant history and varieties of Chinese spoken.

=== Southern Zhejiang ===
Chinese migrants originating from southern Zhejiang, particularly Wenzhou and Qingtian, form one of the longest-established regional Chinese communities in France, with a population of about 350,000 as of 2010. The earliest Chinese migrants to France arrived in the late 19th century and consisted of Wenzhounese merchants who produced Chinese ceramics. During World War I, while most of the 100,000 Chinese laborers recruited to work in France came from northern China, particularly Shandong, a small minority also originated from southern Zhejiang, with a substantial number of them, totalling around 3,000, deciding to remain in France after the war ended. During the 1970s and 1980s, a large wave of Chinese from Wenzhou arrived in France, with a number brought over by family members already present in France.

=== Chinese of French Indochina ===
Following the end of the Vietnam War in 1975, a large number of ethnic Chinese from the former French colonies in Southeast Asia (Vietnam, Laos, and Cambodia) emigrated to France to escape the communist takeover of their countries and persecution by the new governments. The population of this community was about 150,000 as of 2010. Their origins from former French colonies resulted in a strong background of French language and culture upon their arrival and their level of assimilation into French society has been largely quick and successful, being the most integrated Chinese community in France. As in their former countries, ethnic Chinese from Indochina are heavily involved in commerce, especially among the generation of immigrants, and average income levels are above the national median.

Teochew is the most frequently spoken Chinese variety among this community, with Cantonese also prevalent and used as a common commercial and community language due to its status as a historical lingua franca among Chinese in Indochina. Additionally, knowledge of Vietnamese is common among the generation of refugees, who largely originated from the former South Vietnam, while Lao and Khmer are conversant among the smaller number of refugees originating from Laos and Cambodia respectively.

=== Dongbei ===
Over the last decade, newer Chinese immigrants to France have largely originated from Northeast China (Dongbei). Their population as of 2010 was about 15,000. Women largely outnumber men among this Chinese community and often leave China for France in hopes of establishing new lives, largely due to dissatisfaction with life in their homeland. Education levels among the Dongbei vary from secondary level to having degrees in higher education, a rate higher than Wenzhounese immigrants and a little under par with those of Chinese from Indochina. The community has only recently started to become established, with some members opening establishments and becoming economically independent. Nevertheless, the overwhelming majority of ethnic Chinese prostitutes in France have origins in Dongbei, and the group is still looked down upon by their other ethnic Chinese peers in France. Mandarin is the Chinese variety most commonly spoken among members of this community.

== Communal relations ==
The Chinese community in France is divided between the linguistic and migrant groups mentioned above. Hometown associations serve their target migrant group specifically rather than the Chinese population as a whole. While the Dongbei community has recently participated with Wenzhou hometown associations and many members have settled in Wenzhou Chinese areas, Chinese from Indochina still rarely interact with their peer groups from mainland China.

This division of the Chinese community in France is rooted in history, the level of assimilation among groups, and to a lesser extent, politics. While Chinese from Indochina arrived in France largely as Vietnam War refugees, Wenzhounese and Dongbei migrants came for economic purposes, with some having an initial intent to return to China after a few years. Although the Wenzhounese form the oldest Chinese group in France, they are the least assimilated, largely staying within their communities and interacting with the French populace chiefly through business and among the younger generation, education. Due to their origins from China, as well as language barriers, Dongbei migrants have favored associating with the Wenzhounese community rather than the Indochinese one.

In contrast, the generation of immigrants among Chinese from former French Indochina integrated quickly, establishing itself into French society within a short period of time. Chinese from Indochina often share negative French views of mainland Chinese groups, being critical of their rather closed communities and poor French abilities among established immigrants. In fact, a vast majority of community members usually associate themselves with the Vietnamese, Laotian or Cambodian populations in France (depending on their country of origin) instead.

== Political views ==
Regarding politics, Chinese from Indochina are staunchly anti-communist, reflecting the community's mostly refugee origins. While they are critical of the communist parties in their origin countries, criticism is sometimes targeted at the Chinese Communist Party (CCP). Meanwhile, although many Wenzhounese and Dongbei emigrated from China for political purposes, the groups mostly remain indifferent to the CCP. A handful of members of the latter two groups are supportive of the CCP, usually government-sponsored students or businesspeople.

Illegal immigration constitutes political disagreement of larger concern between the two groups. The majority of illegal Asian immigrants to France are from mainland China, specifically the Wenzhou region, with a smaller number from northern China. While Wenzhounese and Dongbei community groups favor granting residency to illegal Chinese immigrants already in France, Chinese from Indochina are strongly opposed to the idea and support the French government's deportation of illegal immigrants. Indochinese community leaders and French politicians have accused illegal mainland Chinese of money laundering. Legal migrants have also been accused of tax evasion and supporting illegal Chinese migrants. A number of illegal Wenzhounese have fled France to neighboring countries such as Italy through the passport-free Schengen Agreement.

The generally poor integration level of immigrants and cases of illegal immigration among the Wenzhounese and Dongbei have led the Chinese community from Indochina regarding the groups as "backward, country-folk", with refusal of cooperation with their community leaders. For example, a string of robberies on Chinese businesses and assaults on individuals belonging to the former two groups and a consequent march against the crimes in the Belleville neighborhood of Paris drew feelings of indifference among the latter Chinese community.

== In popular culture ==
- Marinette Dupain-Cheng, the female protagonist of the animated television series Miraculous: Tales of Ladybug & Cat Noir and her mother, named Sabine Cheng, are a student of Chinese-French descent with the secret superhero identity of Ladybug and an emigrant from China who settled in France before marrying the former's father respectively.
- Chen Liaoping from the Belgian comic series, Cedric is the love interest of the main character of the same namesake in the title along with her parents are emigrants from China who settled in France.

== Notable people ==
- Dai Sijie
- Bérénice Marlohe
- Gao Xingjian
- Jean Pasqualini
- Mylène Jampanoï
- Anne Cheng
- François Cheng
- Zao Wou-Ki
- Frédéric Chau
- Yan Pei-Ming
- Yiqing Yin

== See also ==
- Kwang-Chou-Wan
- Zhanjiang
- China–France relations
- France-Taiwan relations
- Overseas Chinese
- Chinese community in Paris
- Immigration to France
