= Michael Shen Fu-Tsung =

Chinese Jesuit

Michael Fu-Tsung SJ
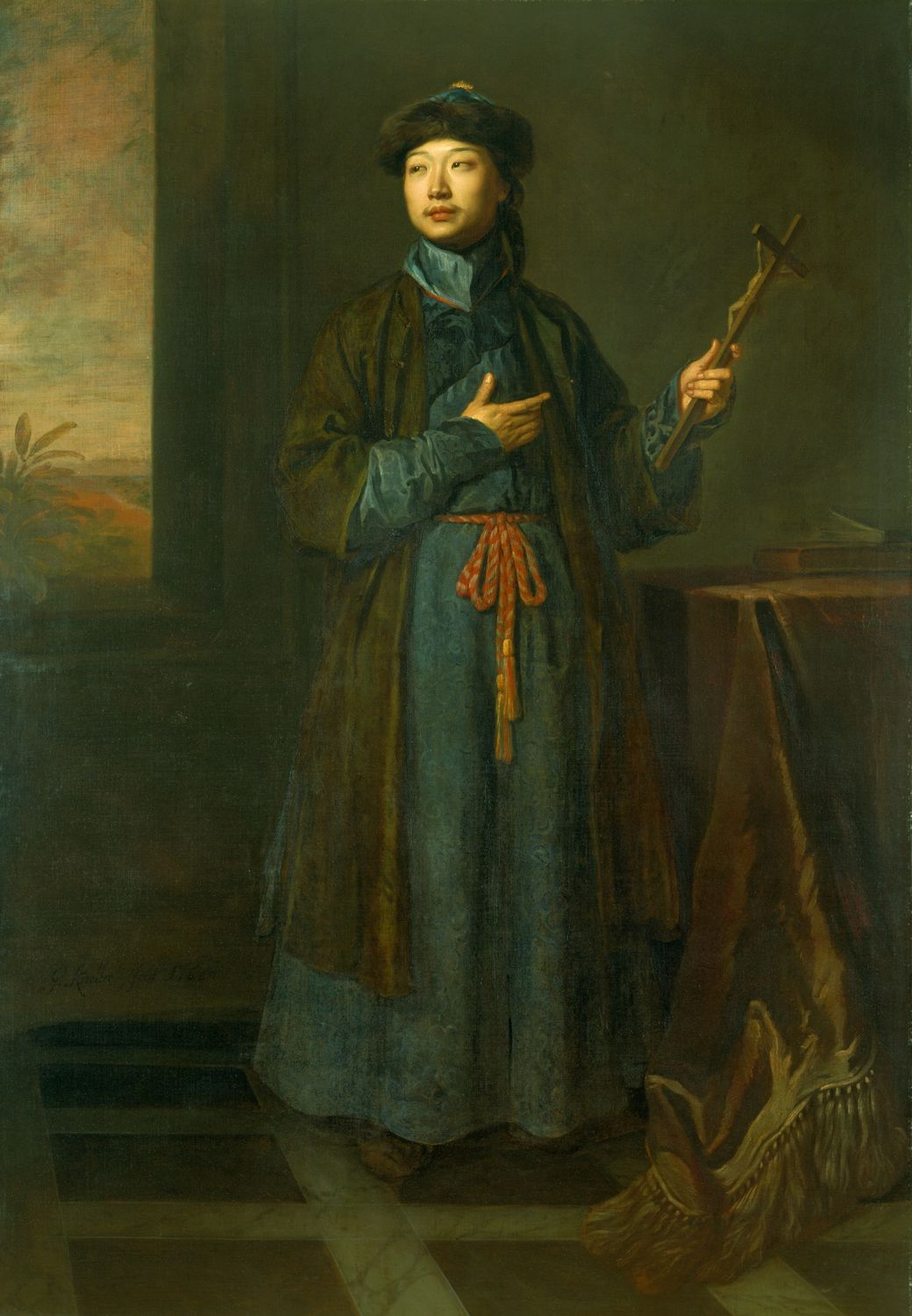
- The Chinese Convert, a portrait of Shen Fu-Tsung by Sir Godfrey Kneller, 1687
- Born: c. 1658; Nanjing, Great Qing
- Died: 1691 (aged c. 33); Mozambique
- Occupation: Mandarin
- Known for: Being an early Chinese visitor to Western Europe

Chinese name
- Chinese: 沈福宗
Transcriptions
Standard Mandarin
- Hanyu Pinyin: Shěn Fúzōng
- Wade–Giles: Shen Fu-tsung

Michael Alphonsus Shen Fu-Tsung, SJ, also known as Michel Sin, Michel Chin-fo-tsoung, Shen Fo-tsung, or Shen Fuzong (Chinese: 沈福宗; pinyin: Shěn Fúzōng; Wade–Giles: Shen Fu-tsung, c. 1658 – 1691), was a Chinese administrator and Jesuit and convert to Christianity.

He was a convert to Catholicism who was brought to Europe by the Flemish Jesuit priest Philippe Couplet, Procurator of the China Jesuit Missions in Rome. They left Macau in 1681 and visited together Flanders, Italy, France, and England. He later became a Jesuit in Portugal and died near Mozambique while returning home.

== Visit to Europe ==
=== Flanders and Rome ===
Michael Shen Fu-Tsung arrived with Philippe Couplet by boat from Portuguese Macau in October 1682. They visited the city where Couplet was born, Mechelen. They then left for Rome, where Couplet tried to obtain a Papal authorization to celebrate mass in Chinese.

=== France ===
Shen was presented to King Louis XIV on 15 September 1684, and he demonstrated how to use chopsticks and how to write Chinese characters. He is described as participating in a royal dinner with Couplet, wearing green silk with deep blue brocade, decorated with Chinese dragons. They also visited the Maison royale de Saint-Louis, where they set up a display of Chinese silk portraits.

=== England and later life ===
After his visit in France, Shen Fu-Tsung also went to Oxford where he met with Thomas Hyde in 1685, and he taught him some Chinese. Shen Fu-Tsung apparently communicated in Latin.

Shen Fu-Tsung also met with King James II. It is the first recorded instance of a Chinese man visiting Britain. The king was so delighted by this visit that he had his portrait made, and had it hung in his bedroom.

Shen Fu-Tsung was able to catalogue the Chinese books that were present in the Bodleian Library, and to describe their content, something which nobody had been able to do until then. He also showed the librarian the correct way to hold a Chinese book, starting with which way was up.

The information Shen gave about the Chinese books was later incorporated into the Catalogi librorum manuscriptorum Angliæ et Hiberniæ in unum collecti (1697/1698), a catalogue of various libraries in England and Ireland. This made the Chinese book collection of the Bodleian Library one of the first in Europe to be thoroughly examined, organised and catalogued.

Shen Fu-Tsung left England in 1688 and went to Lisbon, where he entered the Society of Jesus. He died in September 1691 of a shipboard fever as he was returning to China, somewhere near Portuguese Mozambique.

== See also ==
- Zheng Manuo, the first Chinese international student in Europe and the first Chinese Jesuit priest
- Arcadio Huang, another Chinese man who was active in France a few years after Shen Fu-Tsung
- China–France relations
- Chinese diaspora in France
- Jesuit China missions
- Louis Fan (convert), another Chinese scholar (and later Catholic priest) who visited Europe in the early eighteenth century
