= Anne Cheng =

French Sinologist

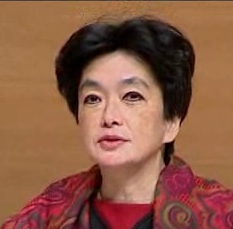
- Cheng in 2008
- Born: 11 July 1955 (age 70); Paris, France
- Known for: Chinese philosophy
- Father: François Cheng

Chinese name
- Traditional Chinese: 程艾蘭
- Simplified Chinese: 程艾兰
Transcriptions
Standard Mandarin
- Hanyu Pinyin: Chéng Àilán
- Wade–Giles: Ch'eng Ai-lan

Anne Cheng (simplified Chinese: 程艾兰; traditional Chinese: 程艾蘭; pinyin: Chéng Àilán; born 11 July 1955) is a French Sinologist who teaches at the Collège de France and specializes in Chinese history and the history of Chinese philosophy. Pablo Ariel Blitstein, the author of "A new debate about alterity," describes her as an "important representative of French sinology".

She was born in Paris in 1955 to Chinese parents, academic François Cheng and a painter, who later became French citizens. Anne Cheng graduated from the École Normale Supérieure. She has taught and conducted research on sinology for the Centre national de la recherche scientifique (CNRS), and the Institut national des langues et civilisations orientales (INALCO). She has had appointments to the Institut universitaire de France and the Collège de France.

== Publications ==
=== Books ===
- Entretiens de Confucius (Full translation from Chinese with introduction, notes, maps & chronology), Paris, Seuil, 1981 (2nd edition 1985), 180 p.
- Étude sur le confucianisme han : l'élaboration d'une tradition exégétique sur les classiques, Paris, Institut des hautes études chinoises, 1985, 322 p.
- Histoire de la pensée chinoise, Paris, Seuil, 1997, 650 p.
- La Chine pense-t-elle ?, Paris, Collège de France/Fayard, 2009.
- Le Pousse-pousse (Full translation from Chinese; with François Cheng), Paris, Picquier, 2012.

=== Collective works ===
- La pensée en Chine aujourd'hui, Paris, Gallimard, 2007, 478 p.
- Les grandes civilisations, Paris, Collège de France/Bayard, 2011.
- Lectures et usages de la Grande Étude (Chine, Corée, Japon), Paris, Odile Jacob, 2015.
- Exploring Courtroom Discourse: The Language of Power and Control, London/New York, Routledge, 2016.
- Hériter, et après ?, Paris, Gallimard (coll. Folio), 2017.
- Tous philosophes ?, Paris, Gallimard (coll. Folio), 2019.
- Une boussole pour l'Après, Paris, Collège de France, 2020.
- Civilisations : questionner l'identité et la diversité, Paris, Odile Jacob, 2021.
- Le Traité des rites : canonisation du rituel et ritualisation de la société, Paris, Maisonneuve et Larose, 2021.
- India-China : Intersecting Universalities, Paris, Collège de France, 2021.
- Historians of Asia on Political Violence, Paris, Collège de France, 2021.
- Penser en Chine, Paris, Gallimard (coll. Folio), 2021.

== Honours and awards ==
=== Honours ===
- 2024 : Commander of the National Order of Merit.
- 2016 : Officier of the Legion of Honour.
- 2013 : Officier of the National Order of Merit.
- 2008 : Knight of the Legion of Honour.

=== Awards ===
- 1998 : The Prix Stanislas Julien of the Académie des Inscriptions et Belles-Lettres.
- 1997 : Prize Dagnan-Bouveret of the Académie des Sciences Morales et Politiques.

=== Honorary degrees ===
- Fudan University.
- Autonomous University of Barcelona.

== See also ==
- Chinese diaspora in France

== Notes and references ==
- List of works was taken from fr:Anne Cheng (Revision)
