= François Cheng =

French sinologist (born 1929)

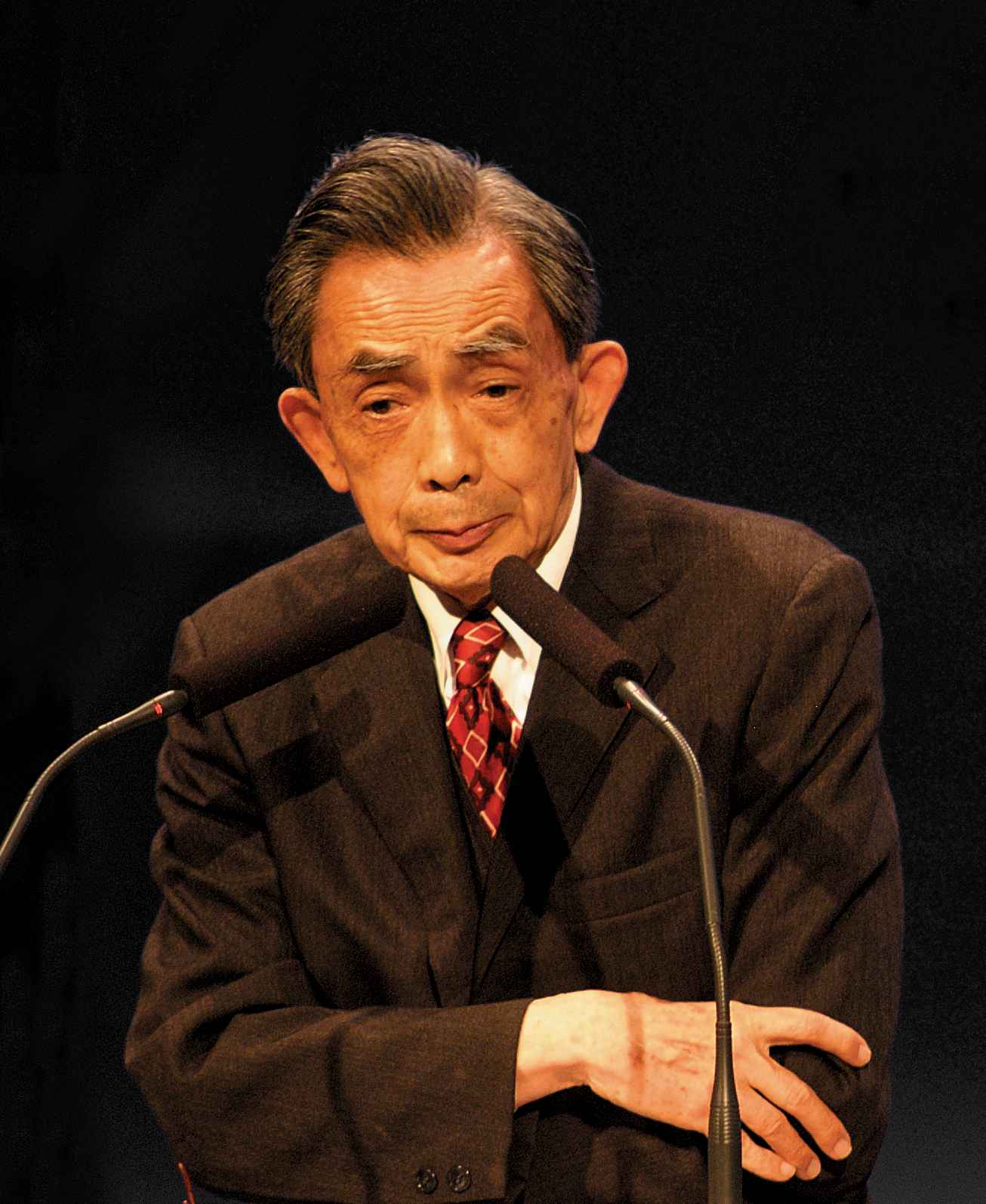
- Cheng in 2004
- Born: 30 August 1929 (age 96); Nanchang, China
- Education: Nanjing University; École pratique des hautes études
- Occupation: Writer
- Known for: Member of the académie française
- Children: Anne Cheng
- Father: Cheng Qibao

Chinese name
- Traditional Chinese: 程抱一
- Simplified Chinese: 程抱一
Transcriptions
Standard Mandarin
- Hanyu Pinyin: Chéng Bàoyī
- Wade–Giles: Ch'eng Pao-i

Birth name
- Traditional Chinese: 程紀賢
- Simplified Chinese: 程纪贤
Transcriptions
Standard Mandarin
- Hanyu Pinyin: Chéng Jìxián
- Wade–Giles: Cheng Chi-hsien

François Cheng (Chinese: 程抱一; pinyin: Chéng Bàoyī; born 30 August 1929) is a Chinese-born French academician, writer, poet, and calligrapher. He is the author of essays, novels, collections of poetry and books on art written in the French language, and the translator of some of the great French poets into Chinese.

== Biography ==
Born in Nanchang, Jiangxi in 1929, Cheng travelled to France in 1948 at the age of nineteen. In his 2002 speech to the Académie française, Cheng said,

"I became a Frenchman in law, mind and heart more than thirty years ago [...] especially from that moment when I resolutely went over to the French language, making it the weapon, or the soul, of my creative work. This language, how can I say everything that I owe to it? It is so intimately bound up with the way I live and my inner life that it has proved to be the emblem of my destiny."

Cheng's first works were academic studies about Chinese poetry and painting. In the late 1960s and early 1970s, he worked with the psychoanalyst Jacques Lacan on studying and translating texts from the classical Chinese canon. These exchanges informed Lacan's late teaching on psychoanalytic interpretation. Later he began to write poems in French, before finally turning to the writing of novels.

Cheng won the 1998 Prix Femina for his novel Le Dit de Tianyi ("The Tale of Tianyi") (Albin Michel, Paris, 1998). In 2002 he was elected to the Académie française, the first person of Asian origin to be so honoured. Since 2008, he has been a member of the Fondation Chirac's honour committee.

=== Marriage and family ===
Cheng married a painter who was also a Chinese national. They became French citizens and had a family. Their daughter Anne Cheng, born in Paris in 1955, also became an academic and sinologist.

== Bibliography ==
- Analyse formelle de l'œuvre poétique d'un auteur des Tang : Zhang Ruoxu (1970)
- Le Pousse-pousse, by Lao She, (translation, 1973)
- L'Écriture poétique chinoise (1977)
- Vide et plein: le langage pictural chinois (1979)
- L'espace du rêve: mille ans de peinture chinoise (1980)
- Sept poètes français (1983)
- Henri Michaux, sa vie, son œuvre (1984)
- Chu Ta : le génie du trait (1986)
- Some Reflections on Chinese Poetic Language and its Relation to Chinese Cosmology dans The Vitality of the Lyric Voice (1986)
- The Reciprocity of Subject and Object in Chinese Poetic Language dans Poetics East and West (1988)
- De l'arbre et du rocher (1989)
- Entre source et nuage, Voix de poètes dans la Chine d'hier et d'aujourd'hui (1990)
- Saisons à vie (1993)
- Trente-six poèmes d'amour (1997)
- Quand les pierres font signe (1997) (with Fabienne Verdier)
- Le Dit de Tianyi (1998, Prix Femina)
- Shitao : la saveur du monde (1998, Prix André Malraux)
- Cantos toscans (1999)
- D'où jaillit le chant (2000)
- Double chant (2000, Prix Roger Caillois)
- Et le souffle devient signe (2001)
- Qui dira notre nuit (2001)
- L'éternité n'est pas de trop, Albin Michel, (2002)
- Le Dialogue, Une passion pour la langue française, Desclée de Brouwer, (2002)
- Le Long d'un amour, Arfuyen, (2003)
- Le Livre du vide médian, Albin Michel, (2004)
- Que nos instants soient d'accueil, with Francis Herth (2005)
- À l'orient de tout, Gallimard, (2005)
- Cinq méditations sur la beauté, Albin Michel, (2006)
- L'un vers l'autre. En voyage avec Victor Segalen, Albin Michel, (2008)
- Quand reviennent les âmes errantes, Albin Michel, (2012)
- Cinq méditations sur la mort – autrement dit sur la vie – Broché (2013)
- La vraie gloire est ici, Gallimard, (2015)
- Enfin le royaume - quatrains, Gallimard, (2018)
- Une longue route pour m'unir au chant français, Albin Michel, (2022)

== See also ==
- Chinese diaspora in France
