= The Chinese Convert =

1687 painting by Godfrey Kneller

- Michael Alphonsus Shen Fu-Tsung
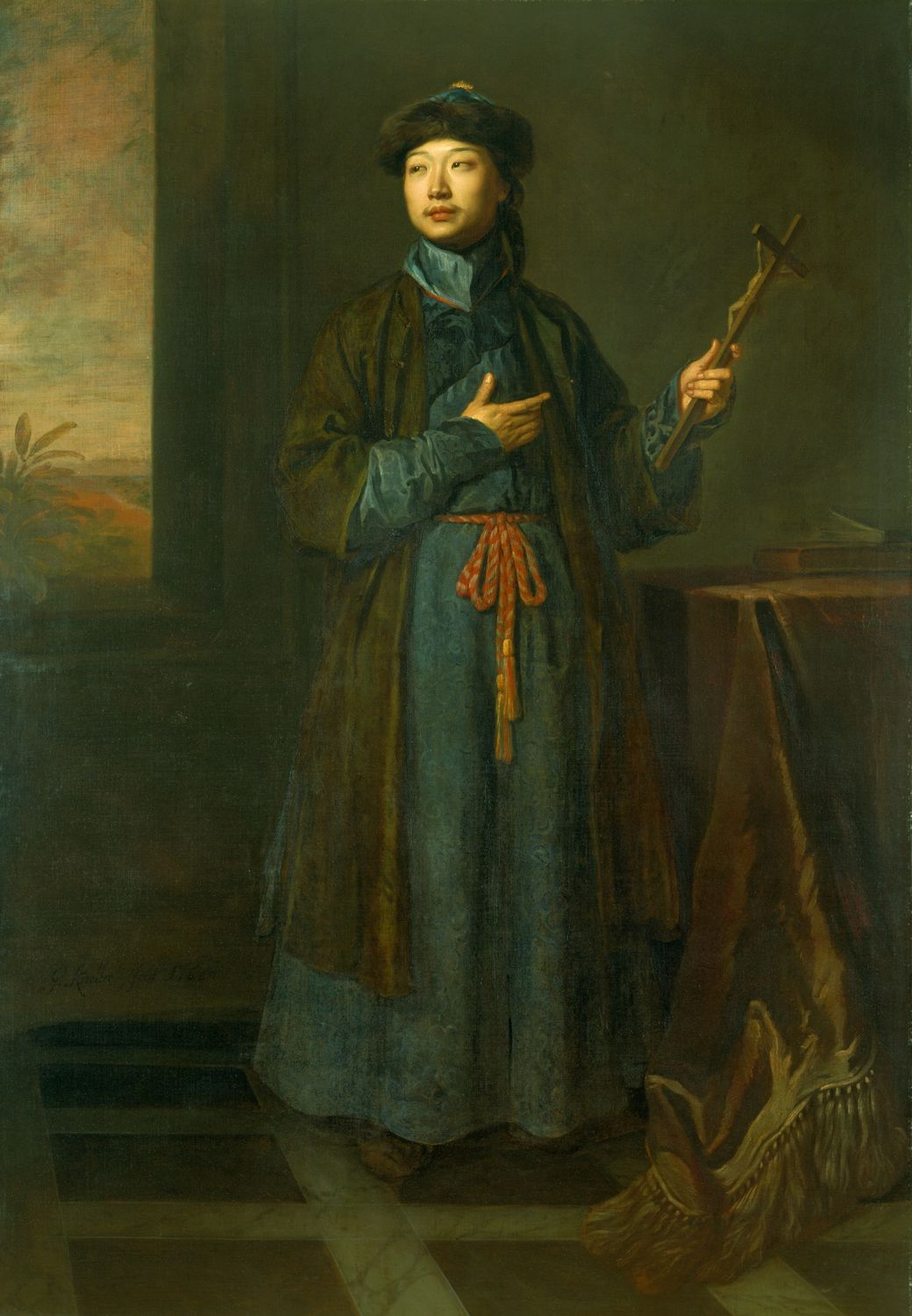
- Artist: Godfrey Kneller
- Year: 1687
- Medium: Oil-on-canvas
- Subject: Michael Alphonsius Shen Fu-Tsung
- Dimensions: 212.2 cm × 147.6 cm (83.5 in × 58.1 in)
- Owner: Royal Collection
- Accession: RCIN 405666

The Chinese Convert is a 1687 painting by the German-born British painter Godfrey Kneller depicting the Chinese Catholic convert Michael Shen Fu-Tsung. It is held in the Royal Collection.

== History ==
The painting was ordered by King James II when he met Shen Fu-Tsung during his visit to England in 1685. The king was so delighted by this visit that he commissioned the portrait, and had it hung in his bedroom. The portrait remains in the Royal Collection, and usually still hangs at Windsor Castle. Shen also visited Oxford, where he helped catalogue the Bodleian Library's collection of Chinese books.

Shen left China in 1681 with Philippe Couplet SJ for a tour of Europe, where Couplet planned to promote the Jesuit's China Mission and plead the Jesuit cause before Pope Innocent XI. Couplet was to be accompanied by five Chinese candidates for the priesthood, including Wu Li (Simon de Cunha) and Shen Fuzhong (Michael Shen). In the end, only Michael Shen and another young candidate left with Couplet, and after a delay in Batavia, only Michael Shen went with Couplet on that tour of Europe.

Being a young Jesuit candidate, Shen's meeting with the English king was only possible during a brief period in post-Reformation English history, when the king was a Roman Catholic and Jesuits were received at court. A year later, in 1688, James II was deposed and replaced by the Protestant William III and Mary II, and so that encounter between king, Jesuit, and artist – James II, Michael Shen Fuzong, and Sir Godfrey Kneller – could not otherwise have happened. But the result of that encounter was an important Western portrait of a Chinese subject, and hence also its name, The Chinese Convert.
