= Caspar Castner =

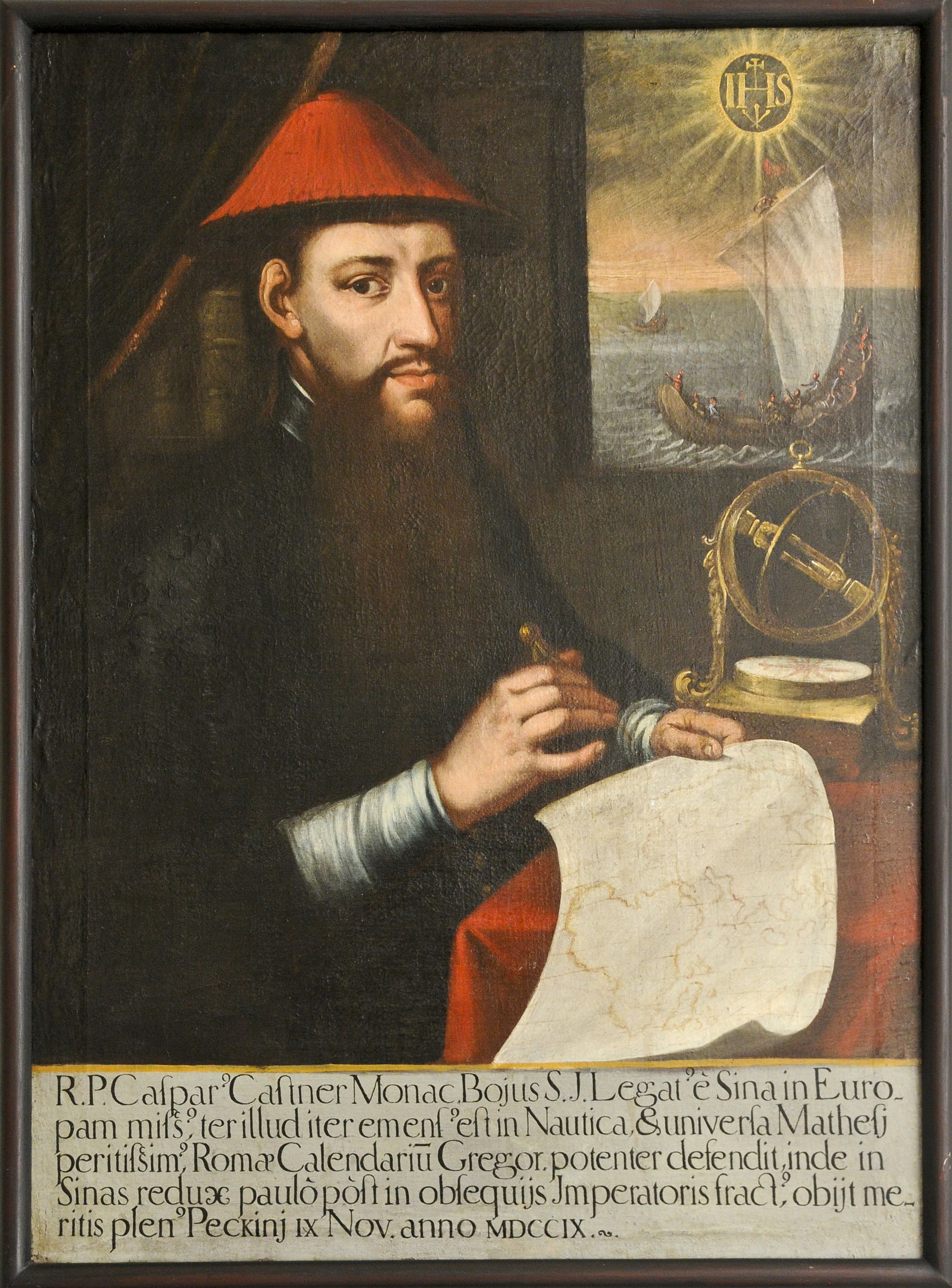

Pang Jiabin
- Traditional Chinese: 龐嘉賓
- Simplified Chinese: 庞嘉宾
Transcriptions
Standard Mandarin
- Hanyu Pinyin: Páng Jiābīn
- Wade–Giles: P‘ang Chia-pin

The Reverend Caspar Castner (7 October 1655 – 9 November 1709) was a Jesuit missionary to the Qing Empire.

== Life ==
Caspar Castner was born in Munich, Bavaria, on 7 October 1655. He entered the Society of Jesus ("Jesuits") on 17 September 1681, and studied theology at Ingolstadt. He finished his studies there on 22 March 1694. For a short time, he taught logic at the gymnasium in Ratisbon. Afterward, he devoted himself to the work of missions and sailed in 1696 for China at the head of a company of brother Jesuits from Portugal and Genoa.

In China, where he was known as Pang Jiabin, he laboured with great success on Shangchuan Island and in the city of Foshan, then a competitor of Guangzhou. In 1702 he went with fellow missionary François Noël to Lisbon and Rome in order, as representative of the bishops of Nanjing and Macao, to argue against the Bishop of Fujian's reopening of the Chinese Rites controversy. In 1706, he returned to China, along with a number of missionaries.

He died in Beijing, China, on 9 November 1709. He was buried in the Jesuits' Zhalan Cemetery in Beijing.

== Works ==
Noël and Castner collaborated on a number of reports on the question of Chinese rites.

Castner wrote Relatio Sepulturæ Magno Orientis Apostolo S. Francisco Xaviero erectæ in Insula Sanciano MDCC. This was a description of Shangchuan Island and his work there from 19 March to 2 June 1700 erecting a memorial on the grave of Francis Xavier. The book included a map of the island.

One of the few copies printed in China is in the so-called "Orban'sche Sammlung" of the library of the Ludwig-Maximilians-Universität München. A translation was published by Father Joseph Stöcklein in his "Welt-Bott" (Augsburg, 1729), No. 309. The title-page and map are reproduced in the work of Henri Cordier, "L'imprimerie sino-européenne en chine" (Paris, 1901), 11-15.

== Legacy ==
Besides his apostolic work, Castner worked in the sciences of navigation, astronomy, and cartography. He called the attention of the Portuguese Government to the fact that the voyage to Macau would be much shorter if the vessels followed a direct course from the Cape of Good Hope by the way of the Sunda Islands, avoiding Mozambique and Goa, and the result showed that he was right. He did excellent work in the mapping of the Chinese Empire, and had so great a reputation as a mathematician that he was made president of the mathematical tribunal and instructor of the heir to the throne.
