= Michel Fourmont =

French antiquarian

Michel Fourmont (1690–1746) was a French antiquarian and classical scholar, Catholic priest and traveller. A member of the Académie des Inscriptions, he was one of the scholars sent by Louis XV to the eastern Mediterranean to collect inscriptions and manuscripts. He is now best remembered for the destruction of the antiquities in Ancient Sparta and for having presented as genuine some forged inscriptions.

== Life ==
His father was Étienne Fourmont of Herblay in the Paris region, a surgeon and official; Étienne Fourmont (1683–1745) was his brother. He became a Catholic priest, and an orientalist pupil of his brother in Paris.

Fourmont became a private tutor, and was given the Chair of Syriac at the Collège royal in 1720. He was admitted as an associate of the Académie des inscriptions et belles-lettres in 1724.

In 1728 Fourmont was sent by Louis XV to Constantinople and Greece, leaving in 1729 with François Sevin. They were under instructions from Jean-Paul Bignon, the king's librarian, to search out surviving Byzantine manuscripts, and the journey was supported by the Comte de Maurepas, for the greater glory of French scholarship.

Fourmont traveled in Greece and the Aegean Sea for over a year, but had little luck in finding early manuscripts of ancient authors sitting in monastic libraries. He would report to Maurepas in February 1730:

Since I have been in the Morea and the buyurdi (written order) of the muhassil-aga (senior Ottoman official) was sent, I have visited all the monasteries of the Argolid, of Sicyonia, of Achaea, of Arcadia, of Messenia, and some of Elis and Tsakonia. In more than sixty abbeys, Monseigneur, and more than 150 metochia or priories, I have not found a single book that merited entering the Royal Library.

Therefore, Fourmont made collecting ancient Greek inscriptions his primary focus. Fourmont would report to Count Maurepas that he copied 1,500 ancient inscriptions (300 in Sparta). His technique was brutally direct. Workmen were hired to dismantle any structure that might contain ancient stones with letters on them. Fourmont reported paying 1,200 man-days of labour to dismantle monuments in search of ancient marbles. In a letter to Bignon dated 20 April 1730, Fourmont wrote:

For more a month, although ill, I am working with 30 laborers for the complete destruction of Sparta; hardly a day goes by without finding something, and some days have produced as many as 20 inscriptions. If I could do at Tegea, Antigonia (Mantineia), Nemea and one or two other cities what I have done at Hermione, Troezen, and Sparta, it wouldn't be necessary to send anyone here. There would be nothing left. I have not been able to knock down the remains of the former places, because of the plague, without which they would be totally destroyed. For lack of books, these destructions shall be the only way to make illustrious a voyage which has caused such a stir.

In the same letter he wrote:

Speaking frankly, I myself am astonished at this expedition. I have read nowhere that, since the restoration of literature, anyone has had the idea of turning whole cities upside down to find these marbles, which are the only irreproachable evidence of antiquity, the only things capable of shedding light on the dark corners of history, of the administration and religion of ancient peoples. Only in this manner can one contribute usefully to science. So convinced am I that Sparta is the fifth city of the Morea I have destroyed. Hermione and Troezen have had the same fate. I have not spared Argos, Phliasia, and some others. I am currently working to dismantle the temple of Amyclaean Apollo down to the foundation stone. Every day one finds things you will be pleased to see. ... I would destroy others with the same ease if I were left to do so.

Fourmont was called back to France before he could visit ancient Olympia as planned. Back in France, Fourmont published only a short report. He was elected a member of the Royal Society on 4 November 1742.

== Legacy ==
Later travelers to Greece were horrified at Fourmont's descriptions of the ancient monuments he destroyed. Fourmont is alleged to have written in one of his letters that he had destroyed certain inscriptions after transcribing them. The Irish traveler Edward Dodwell reported that when he visited Sparta (in 1806) he was shown marbles that Fourmont had mutilated so as to make their inscriptions illegible. That some of Fourmont's most important inscriptions from Amyclae could not be relocated helped fuel scholarly suspicions that he had either forged or seriously misrepresented the inscriptions he reported.

In 1791 Richard Payne Knight published An Analytical Essay on the Greek Alphabet, in which he argued that Fourmont had forged some inscriptions in his collection. A controversy began. Fourmont's collection of inscriptions was transcribed in 1815 by Immanuel Bekker. The collection of 26 texts from Amyclae, about which doubts had been raised, were identified as forgeries by August Böckh. Where inscriptions could be relocated, Fourmont's transcriptions of the Greek text frequently proved inaccurate: "Corrupt, like most of the Fourmontiana", in Böckh's verdict.

All Fourmont's published work was thus invalidated; but there remained a substantially larger collection of unpublished material. Dodwell wrote of Fourmont in 1819: "Great ambition, and a little learning, with an unfeeling indifference for the monuments of antiquity, incited him to destroy some of the most venerable and interesting records of ancient history."
