= Arcadio Huang =

Chinese philologist

- Traditional Chinese: 黃嘉略
- Simplified Chinese: 黄嘉略
Transcriptions
Standard Mandarin
- Hanyu Pinyin: Huáng Jiālüè
- Wade–Giles: Huang^{2} Chia^{1}-lüeh^{4}
Southern Min
- Tâi-lô: N̂g Ka-lio̍h

Arcadio Huang (Chinese: 黃嘉略; pinyin: Huáng Jiālüè, born in Xinghua, modern Putian, in Fujian, 15 November 1679, died on 1 October 1716 in Paris) was a Chinese Christian convert, brought to Paris by the Missions étrangères. He took a pioneering role in the teaching of the Chinese language in France around 1715. He was preceded in France by his compatriot Michael Shen Fu-Tsung, who visited the country in 1684.

His main works, conducted with the assistance of young Nicolas Fréret, are the first Chinese-French lexicon, the first Chinese grammar of the Chinese, and the diffusion in France of the Kangxi system with two hundred fourteen radicals, which was used in the preparation of his lexicon.

His early death in 1716 prevented him from finishing his work, however, and Étienne Fourmont, who received the task of sorting his papers, assumed all the credit for their publication.

Only the insistence of Nicolas Fréret, as well as the rediscovery of the memoirs of Huang Arcadio have re-established the pioneering work of Huang, as the basis which enabled French linguists to address more seriously the Chinese language.

== Origins ==
Here is the genealogy of Arcadio Huang (originally spelled Hoange) according to Stephen Fourmont:

"Paul Huang, of the Mount of the Eagle, son of Kian-khin (Kiam-kim) Huang, Imperial assistant of the provinces of Nâne-kin (Nanjing) and Shan-ton (Shandong), and lord of the Mount of the Eagle, was born in the city of Hin-houa (Xinghua), in the province of Fò-kién (Fujian), Feb. 12, 1638; was baptized by the Jesuit Father Antonio de Govea, Portuguese, and was married in 1670 with the Miss Apollonie la Saule, named Léou-sien-yâm (Leù-sièn-yam) in the local language, daughter of Mr. Yâm, nicknamed Lou-ooue (Lû-ve), lord Doctor of Leôu-sièn (Leû-sièn) and governor of the city of Couan-sine (Guangxin), in the province of Kiam-si (Jiangxi). Arcadio Huang, interpreter of the King of France, son of Paul Huang, was born in the same city of Hin-Houa, on November 15, 1679, and was christened on November 21 of that year by the Jacobin Father Arcadio of ..., of Spanish nationality. Through his marriage, he had a daughter who is still alive; he added to his genealogy Marie-Claude Huang, of the Eagle Mountain, daughter of Mr. Huang, interpreter to the king, and so on.; She was born March 4, 1715."

He received the education of a Chinese literatus under the protection of French missionaries. The French missionaries saw in Arcadio an opportunity to create a "literate Chinese Christian" in the service of the evangelization of China. In these pioneer years (1690–1700), it was urgent to present to Rome examples of perfectly Christianized Chinese, in order to reinforce the Jesuits' position in the Rites controversy.

== Journey to the West ==
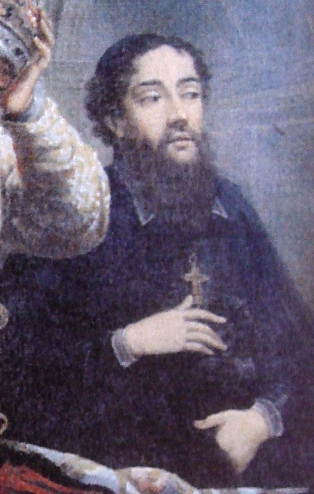
Artus de Lionne (1655–1713), here in 1686, brought Arcadio Huang to Europe and France in 1702.

On 17 February 1702, under the protection of Artus de Lionne, Bishop of Rosalie, Arcadio embarked on a ship of the English East India Company in order to reach London. By September or October 1702, Mr. de Rosalie and Arcadio left England for France, in order to travel to Rome.

On the verge of being ordained a priest in Rome and being presented to the pope to demonstrate the reality of Chinese Christianity, Arcadio Huang apparently renounced and declined ordination. Rosalie preferred to return to Paris to further his education, and wait for a better answer.

== Installation in Paris ==
According to his memoirs, Arcadio moved to Paris in 1704 or 1705 at the home of the Foreign Missions. There, his protectors continued his religious and cultural training, with plans to ordain him for work in China. But Arcadio preferred life as a layman. He settled permanently in Paris as a "Chinese interpreter to the Sun King" and began working under the guidance and protection of abbot Jean-Paul Bignon. It is alleged that he also became the king's librarian in charge of cataloging Chinese books in the Royal library.

Huang encountered Montesquieu, with whom he had many discussions about Chinese customs. Huang is said to have been Montesquieu's inspiration for the narrative device in his Persian Letters, an Asian who discusses the customs of the West.

Huang became very well-known in Parisian salons. In 1713 Huang married a Parisian woman named Marie-Claude Regnier. In 1715 she gave birth to a healthy daughter, also named Marie-Claude, but the mother died a few days later. Discouraged, Huang himself died a year and a half later, and their daughter died a few months after that.

== Work on the Chinese language ==
Helped by the young Nicolas Fréret (1688–1749), he began the hard work of pioneering a Chinese-French dictionary, a Chinese grammar, employing the Kangxi system of 214 character keys.

In this work, they were joined by Nicolas Joseph Delisle (1683–1745), a friend of Fréret, who gave a more cultural and geographical tone to their work and discussions. Deslisle's brother, Guillaume Delisle, was already a renowned geographer. Delisle encouraged Arcadio Huang to read Europe's best known and popular writings dealing with the Chinese Empire. Huang was surprised by the ethnocentric approach of these texts, reducing the merits of the Chinese people and stressing the civilizing role of the European peoples.

A third apprentice, by the name of Étienne Fourmont (imposed by Abbé Bignon), arrived and profoundly disturbed the team. One day, Fourmont was surprised copying Huang's work.

== Debate after his death ==
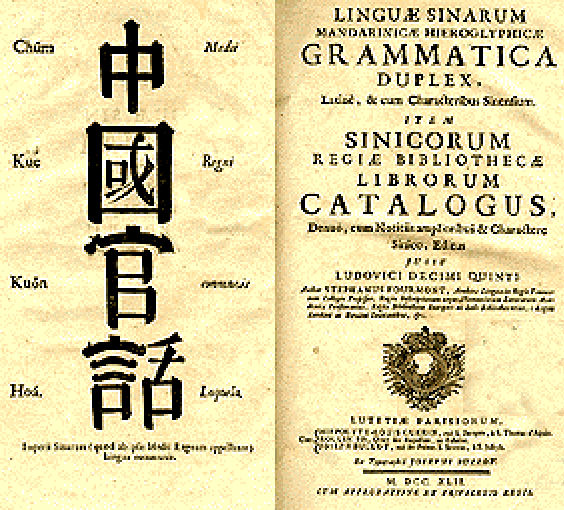
The Chinese grammar published by Étienne Fourmont in 1742

After the death of Huang on 1 October 1716, Fourmont became officially responsible for classifying papers of the deceased. He made a very negative report on the contents of these documents and continued to criticize the work of Huang. Continuing his work on the languages of Europe and Asia (and therefore the Chinese), he took all the credit for the dissemination of the 214 key system in France, and finally published a French-Chinese lexicon and a Chinese grammar, without acknowledging the work of Huang, whom he was continuing to denigrate publicly.

Meanwhile, Fréret, also an Academician, and above all a friend and first student of Arcadio Huang, wrote a thesis on the work and role of Arcadio in the dissemination of knowledge about China in France. Documents saved by Nicolas-Joseph Delisle, Arcadio's second student, also helped to publicize the role of the Chinese subject of the king of France.

Since then, other researchers and historians investigated his role, including Danielle Elisseeff who compiled Moi, Arcade interprète chinois du Roi Soleil in 1985.

== See also ==
- Shen Fo-tsung, another Chinese person who visited France in 1684.
- Fan Shouyi, yet another Chinese person who lived in Europe in the early eighteenth century.
- Chinese diaspora in France
- China–France relations
- Jesuit China missions
