= Joseph-Antoine Provana =

Jesuit missionary to China

- Born: 17 October 1662; Nice, Duchy of Savoy
- Died: 7 February 1720 (aged 57) en route from Lisbon to Macau
- Other names: Antonio Francesco Giuseppe Provana
- Occupation: Catholic missionary
- Years active: 1695 - 1720
- Known for: envoy of the Kangxi Emperor to Rome during the Chinese Rites controversy

Joseph-Antoine Provana (Chinese: 艾若瑟; pinyin: Ài Ruòsè, 17 October 1662 - 7 February 1720) was a Piedmontese Jesuit missionary to China during the era of the Kangxi Emperor and the Chinese Rites controversy. Provana converted and baptized Louis Fan, the first Chinese known to have traveled to Europe and returned to China. He served as an envoy to Pope Clement XI for the Kangxi emperor and arrived in Rome in 1719. He died on his return journey to China, but his corpse was transported to Guangzhou and buried there.

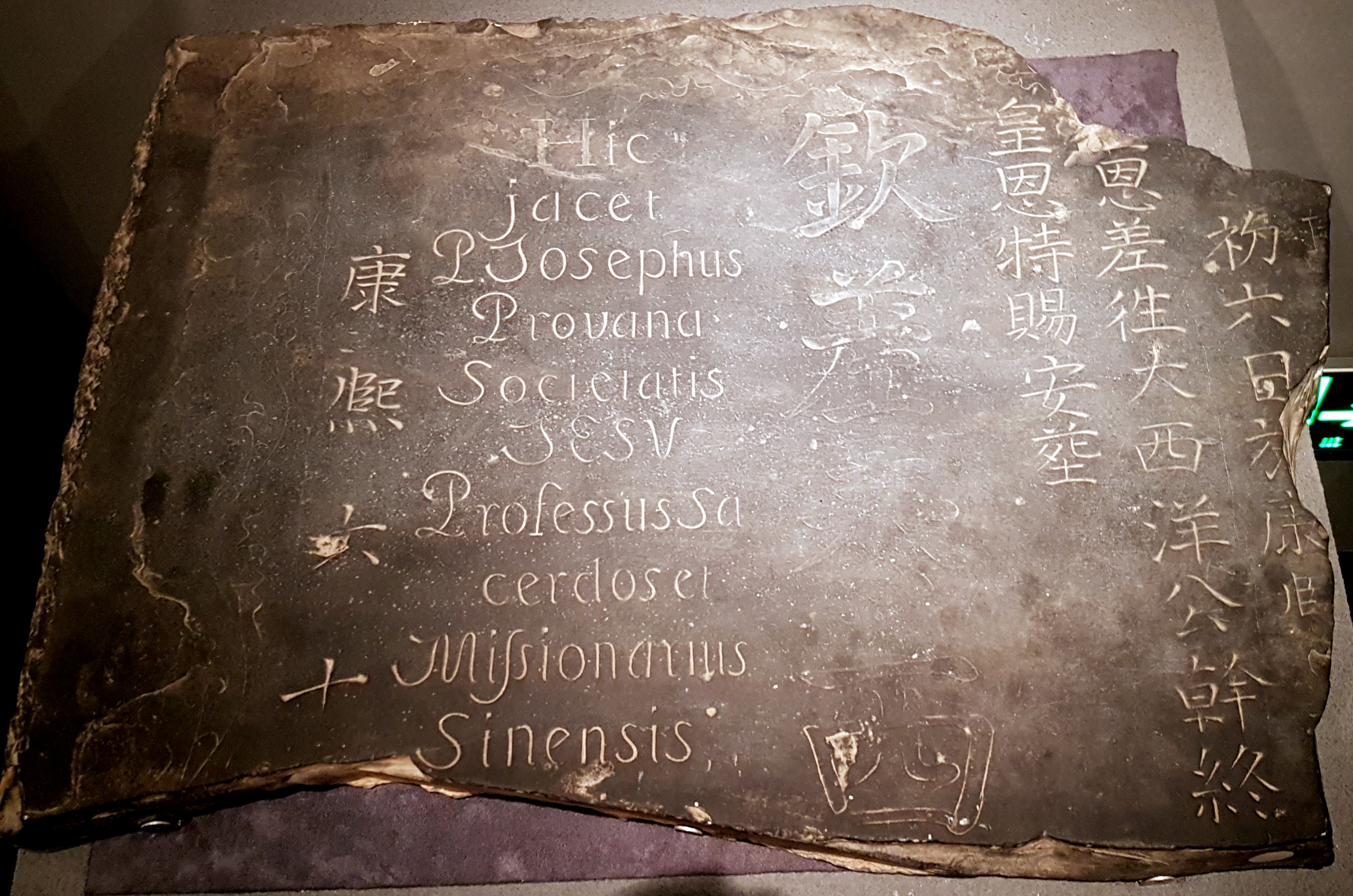
Epitaph from the tomb Joseph-Antoine Provana on display in the Guangzhou City Museum.

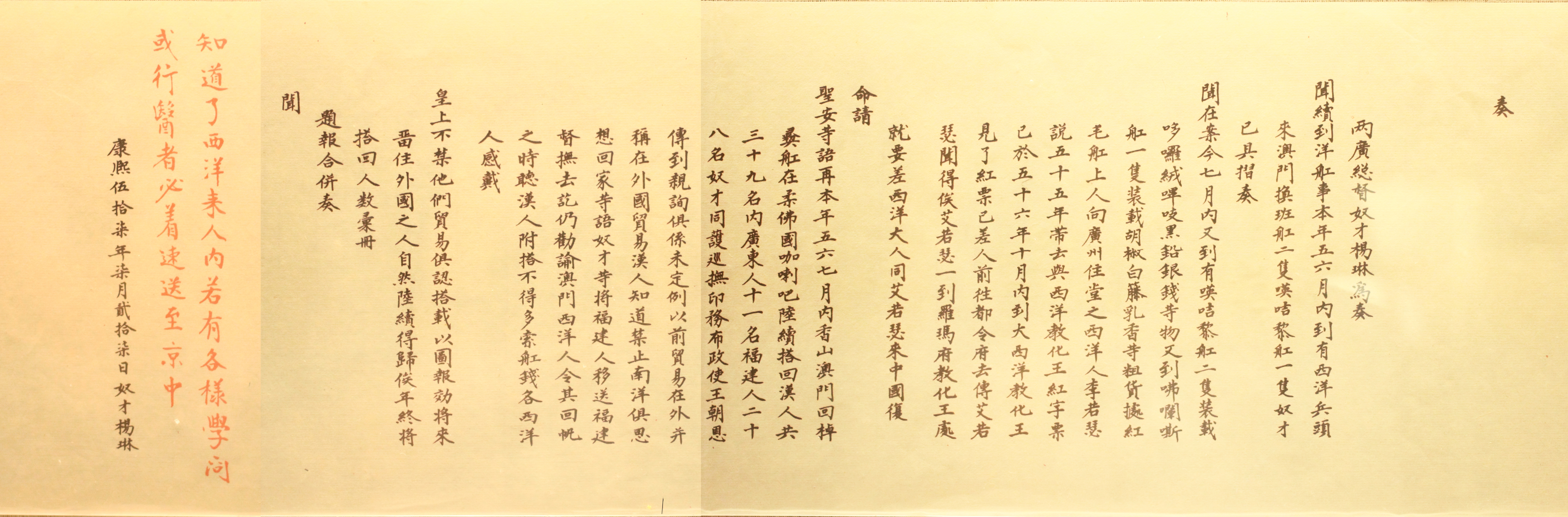
Memorial to the Kangxi Emperor from the Viceroy of Liangguang Yang Lin mentioning Provana's mission to the pope (1719)

== See also ==
- Louis Fan
