= Louis Fan (convert) =

Chinese adventurer, writer, and Catholic priest

- Traditional Chinese: 樊守義
- Simplified Chinese: 樊守义
Transcriptions
Standard Mandarin
- Hanyu Pinyin: Fán Shǒuyì
- Wade–Giles: Fan Shou-i

Louis Fan (13 June 1682 – 28 February 1753), born Fan Shouyi and also known as Luigi Fan, was the first known Chinese person to travel to Europe, return to China, and write an account of his travels. However, in traveling to Europe, he was preceded by Michael Shen Fu-Tsung, Arcadio Huang, and Rabban Bar Sauma, all of whom died abroad before returning to China.

== Life ==
Fan was born in Pingyao, Shanxi, in 1682. Little is known of his early life and family, but at some point, he appears to have met the Piedmontese Jesuit missionary, Antonio Francesco Giuseppe Provana, who converted him to Roman Catholicism and baptised him as "Luigi" or "Louis".

At the time, the different Catholic orders in China were engaged in a controversy over the legitimacy of Confucian or ancestral veneration. In January 1707, the papal legate Charles-Thomas Maillard De Tournon presented Pope Clement XI's decree Cum Deus Optimus... to the Kangxi Emperor, forbidding Catholic converts from participating in such rituals. The emperor ordered the Jesuits to assemble a second mission to attempt to change the pope's mind on the subject. Fan accompanied three Jesuits: Provana, José Ramón Arxó, and François Noël, the last of whom had participated in the first unsuccessful embassy. They left Macao aboard the Portuguese ship Bom Jesus de Mazagão das Brotas on 14 January 1708. The journey allowed Fan to observe Batavia in the Dutch East Indies (now Jakarta, Indonesia) and Bahia in Brazil, probably making him the first Chinese person to return and write about the Americas. They arrived in Lisbon in September 1708, and Fan met King João V of Portugal soon afterwards. Noël may have travelled ahead, but Provana and Fan remained in Portugal for months, only reaching Rome in February of the next year. Unable to change Clement's mind on the issue of the Chinese rituals, Fan toured Italy, studied Latin and theology, and was able to make many first-hand observations of aspects of 18th-century Europe, which very few Asians had had the opportunity to do before him. In 1717, he was ordained as a priest.

In 1718, Pope Clement XI decided to send Provana back to China, so on 19 May 1719, Provana and Fan boarded the Francisco Xavier in Lisbon and set sail once again. Provana died during the voyage, and Fan returned to Macao alone. From Macao, he travelled north to Beijing for an audience with the Kangxi Emperor that was held on 11 October 1720. No account of his meeting with the emperor has survived, but Fan wrote a short report of his experiences in Europe, the Shen Jian Lu (身見錄), which may have been created to complement the information he gave the emperor in person.

For the rest of his life, Fan worked as a priest and missionary in China, and apparently as an interpreter for the emperor; the Italian missionary Matteo Ripa mentions a ‘Louis Fan’ in the book he published on his experiences in China. Fan died in Beijing on 28 February 1753. He was buried in the Jesuits' Zhalan Cemetery in Beijing.

== See also ==
- Zheng Manuo
- Shen Fo-tsung
- Arcadio Huang
- Jesuit China missions
- Chinese Rites controversy
