= Artus de Lionne =

French missionary

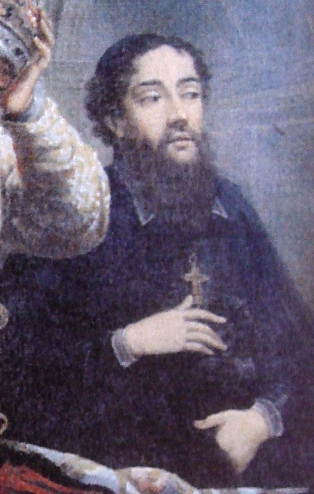
Artus de Lionne (1655–1713) in 1686 (detail).

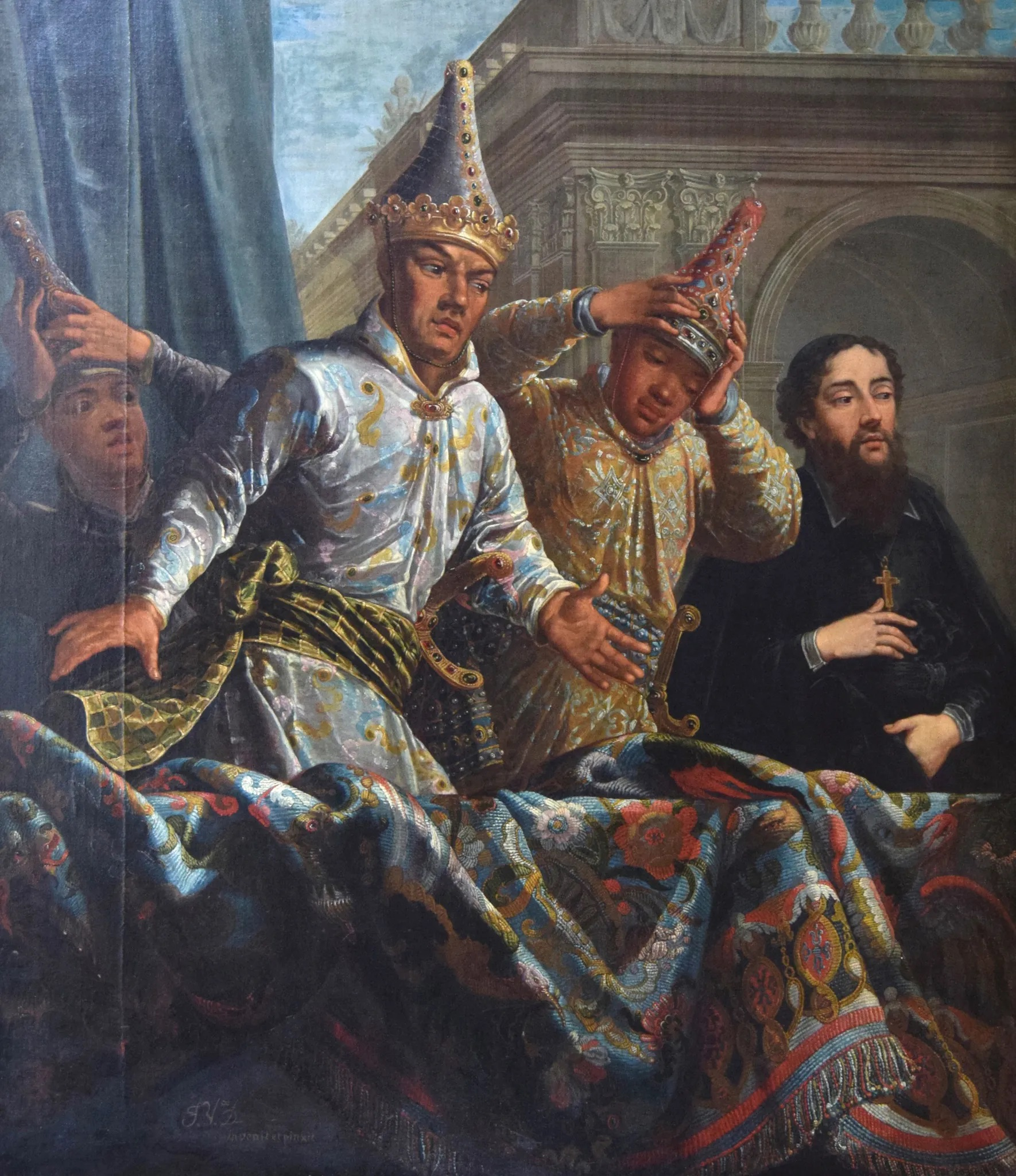
The 1686 Siamese embassy of Kosa Pan, accompanied by their translator, Artus de Lionne (right). Painted by Jacques Vigouroux Duplessis (c.1680–1732).

Artus de Lionne (1655–1713), abbé and Bishop of Rosalie in partibus infidelium, in Turkey, was a French missionary of the Paris Foreign Missions Society. He was a son of Louis XIV's Foreign Minister, Hugues de Lionne.

== Biography ==
Artus de Lionne was born in Rome in 1655. He first left for Siam as a missionary in 1681.

He returned to France in 1686, serving as translator to the embassy of the Siamese Kosa Pan to the court of Louis XIV. Artus de Lionne then returned to Siam with the Siamese embassy in 1687 on board the ships of the French ambassador Simon de la Loubère. He played a role in the negotiation between the French and Siamese sides during the 1688 Siamese Revolution, which resulted in the expulsion of the French forces. Artus de Lionne left Siam with General Desfarges following the French defeat in the Siege of Bangkok, leaving Mgr Louis Laneau a prisoner of the Siamese for several years.

Artus de Lionne then went to China as a missionary in 1689, where he worked with Bishop Maigrot in Fukien province. He was for a time the archbishop of Sichuan (see Catholic Church in Sichuan), although he never went there. He was an opponent of the Jesuits and took the opposite side in the Chinese Rites controversy.

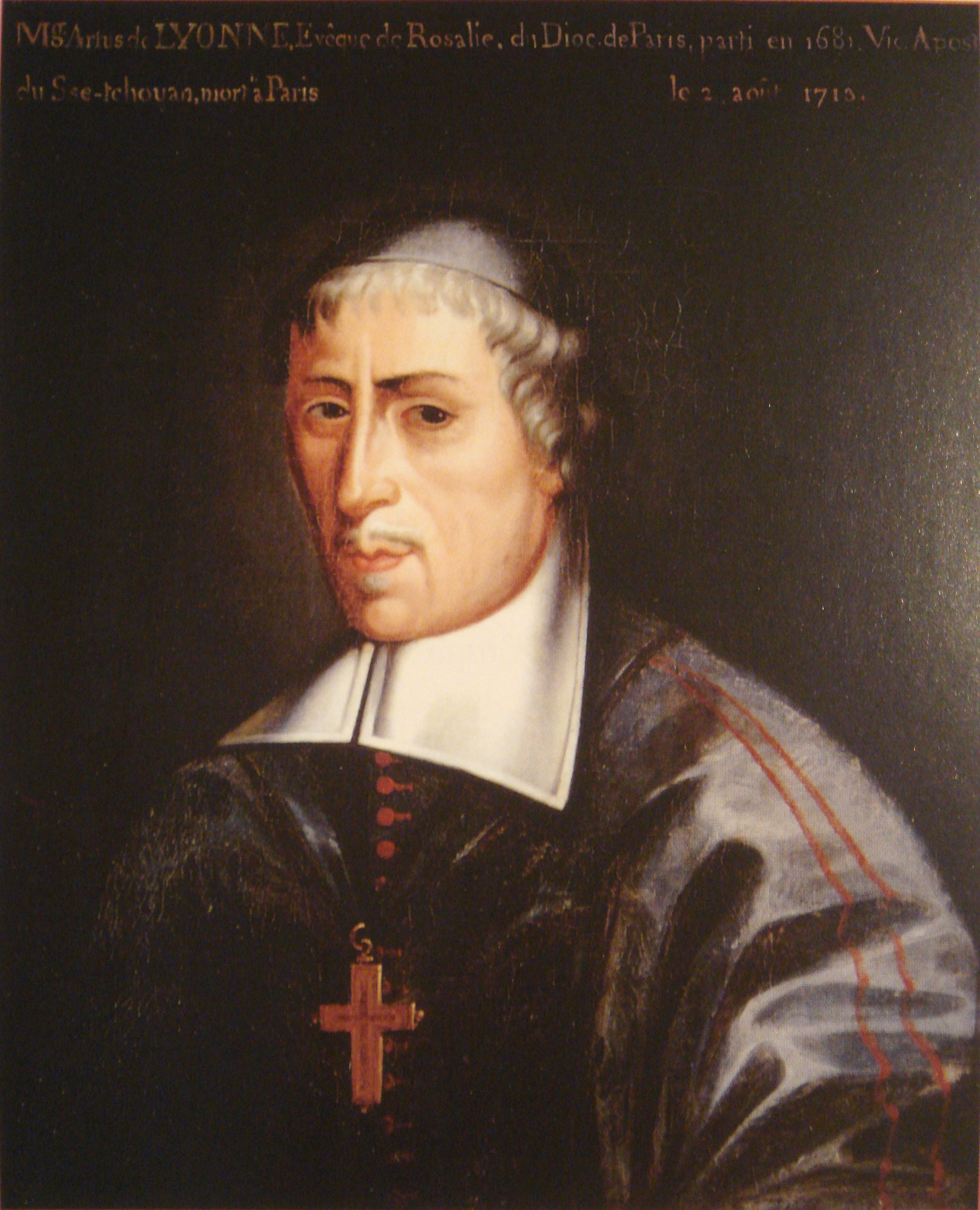
Artus de Lionne, as Bishop of Rosalie.

Artus de Lionne returned to Europe on 17 February 1702, accompanying the Chinese Christian Arcadio Huang. Artus de Lionne and Arcadio Huang embarked on a ship of the English East India Company in order to reach London. By September or October 1702, they left England for France, in order to travel to Rome. On the verge of being ordained a priest in Rome and being presented to the pope to demonstrate the reality of Chinese Christianity, Arcadio Huang apparently renounced and declined ordination. Artus de Lionne preferred to return to Paris to further his education, and wait for a better answer.

In 1705–1707, Artus de Lionne accompanied the mission of Charles-Thomas Maillard De Tournon to the Kangxi Emperor of China. The mission affirmed the prohibition of Chinese rites in 1707, but was as a result banished to Macao.

Artus de Lionne significantly influenced the editing of the 1707 treatise against Chinese philosophy of Nicolas Malebranche (Entretien d'un philosophe Chrétien et d'un philosophe chinois sur l'existence et la nature de Dieu). He died in Paris in 1713.

== Works ==
- Chinese Manual: Sse Tse Ouen Tsien Tchou [四字文笺註] Four Words Literature (with) Commentary (or) Explication. ("Recueil de Phrases Chinoises, Composées de Quatre Caractères Et Dont Les Explications Sont Rangées Dans L'ordre Alphabétique Français")
- Lionne, Artus de: Le journal de voyage au Siam de l'abbé de Lionne; suivi de Mémoire sur l'affaire. Paris: "Églises d'Asie", 2001. ISBN 2-914402-33-3
