= Cheonhado =

Circular world map

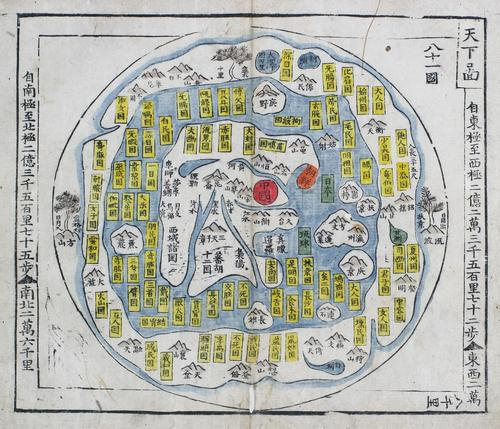
- Cheonhado, Korean circular world map.

Korean name
- Hangul: 천하도
- Hanja: 天下圖
- RR: Cheonhado
- MR: Ch'ŏnhado

The Cheonhado (Korean: 천하도; Hanja: 天下圖; lit. 'Map of the world beneath the heavens'), or sometimes Cheonha jeondo (천하전도; 天下全圖; lit. 'Complete map of the world beneath the heavens'), is a peculiar type of circular world map developed in Korea during the 17th century. It is based on the Korean term for map, jido, translated roughly as "land picture".

== Description ==
The Cheonhado 9 maps were made in response to the encounter with the geographical knowledge of the West, but based in content on traditional Asian sources and Asian in style. The structure of the maps consists of an internal continent with historical place names, an internal sea with place names connected to descriptions of Taoist immortality, an external continent, and an external sea. Surprisingly, the maps did not reflect the highest levels of geographic knowledge available to Koreans, but this is not likely to be intentional. Some of this was due to the nautical distance between Korea and other East Asian locales affected the mapmakers perceptions of Asia. Similarly, European mapmakers of the day often treated Korea as an island.

Some scholars have attributed the development of Korean circular world maps to Western influence, such as the maps of Matteo Ricci (Kunyu Wanguo Quantu) or the maps of Giulio Aleni (Wanguo Quantu). In this case, the central landmass can be viewed as a combination of Asia, Africa, and Europe, and the external "ring" continent as North America and South America.

Such maps were produced in Korea only, and have not been found in China or Japan.

The Cheonhado remained popular in Korea until the late 19th century.

== Gallery ==
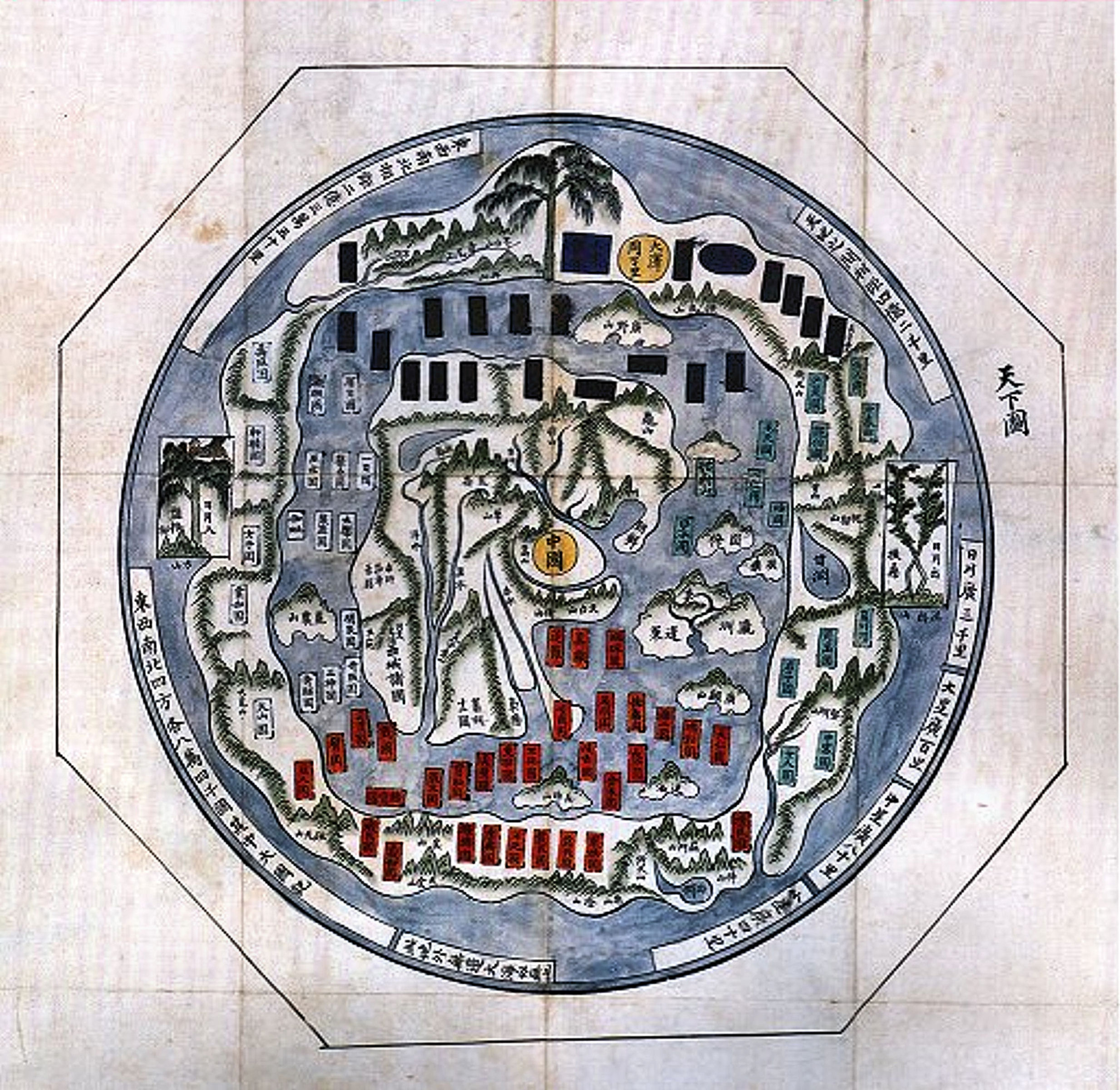
A coloured Cheonhado.

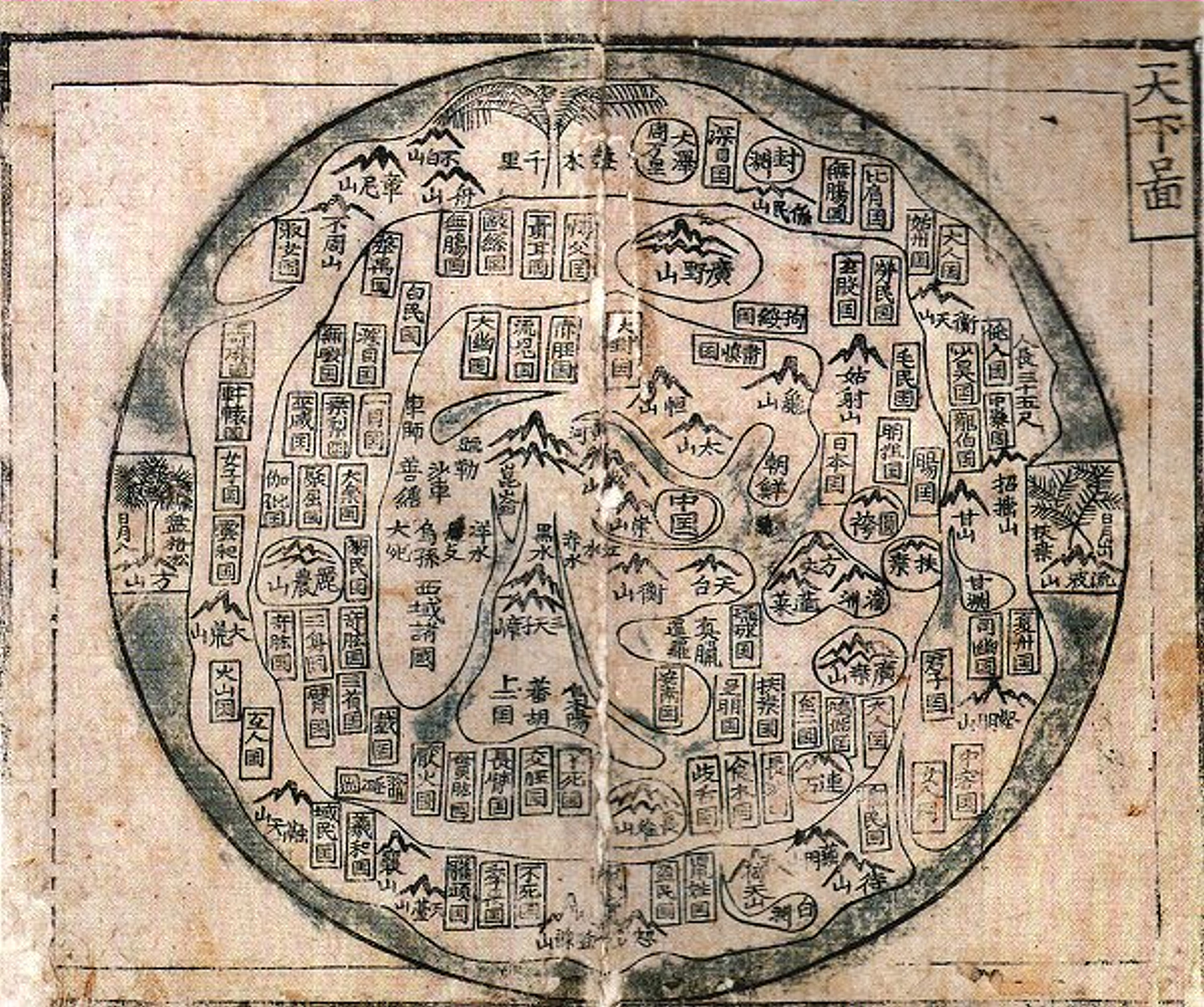
Another Cheonhado map.

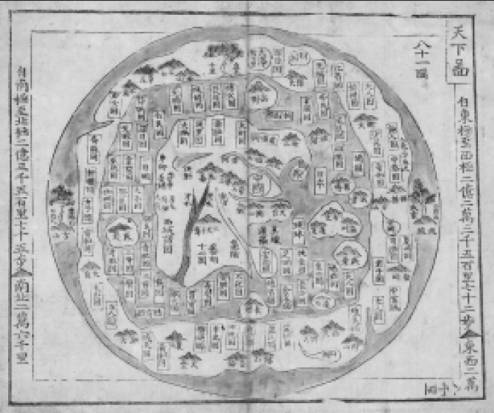
Another Cheonhado.

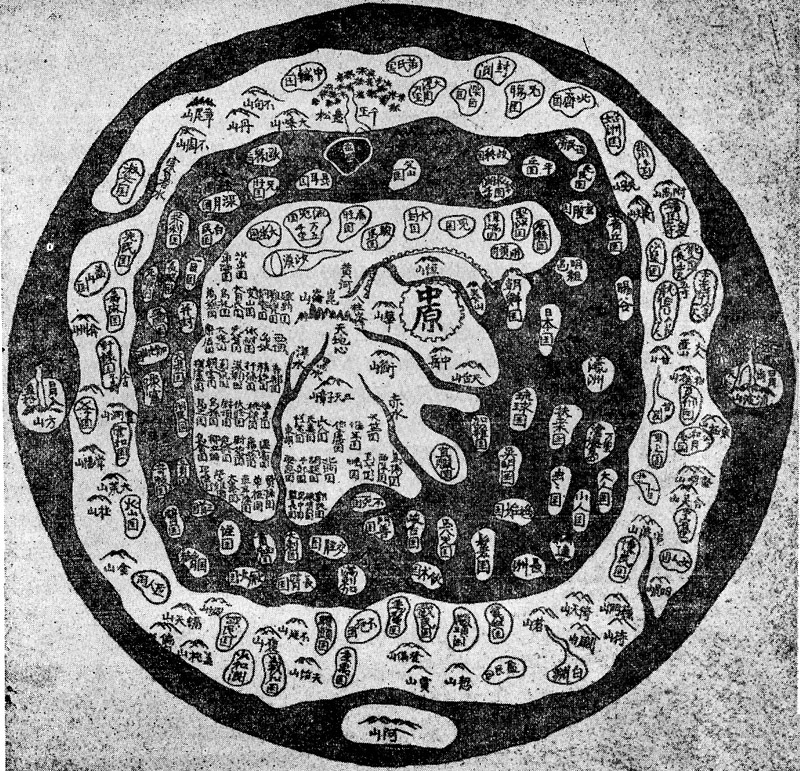
Cheonhado, a 17th-century Korean circular world map.

== See also ==
- Shanhai Yudi Quantu
- Wanguo Quantu
