= Busan Museum =

History museum in Busan, South Korea

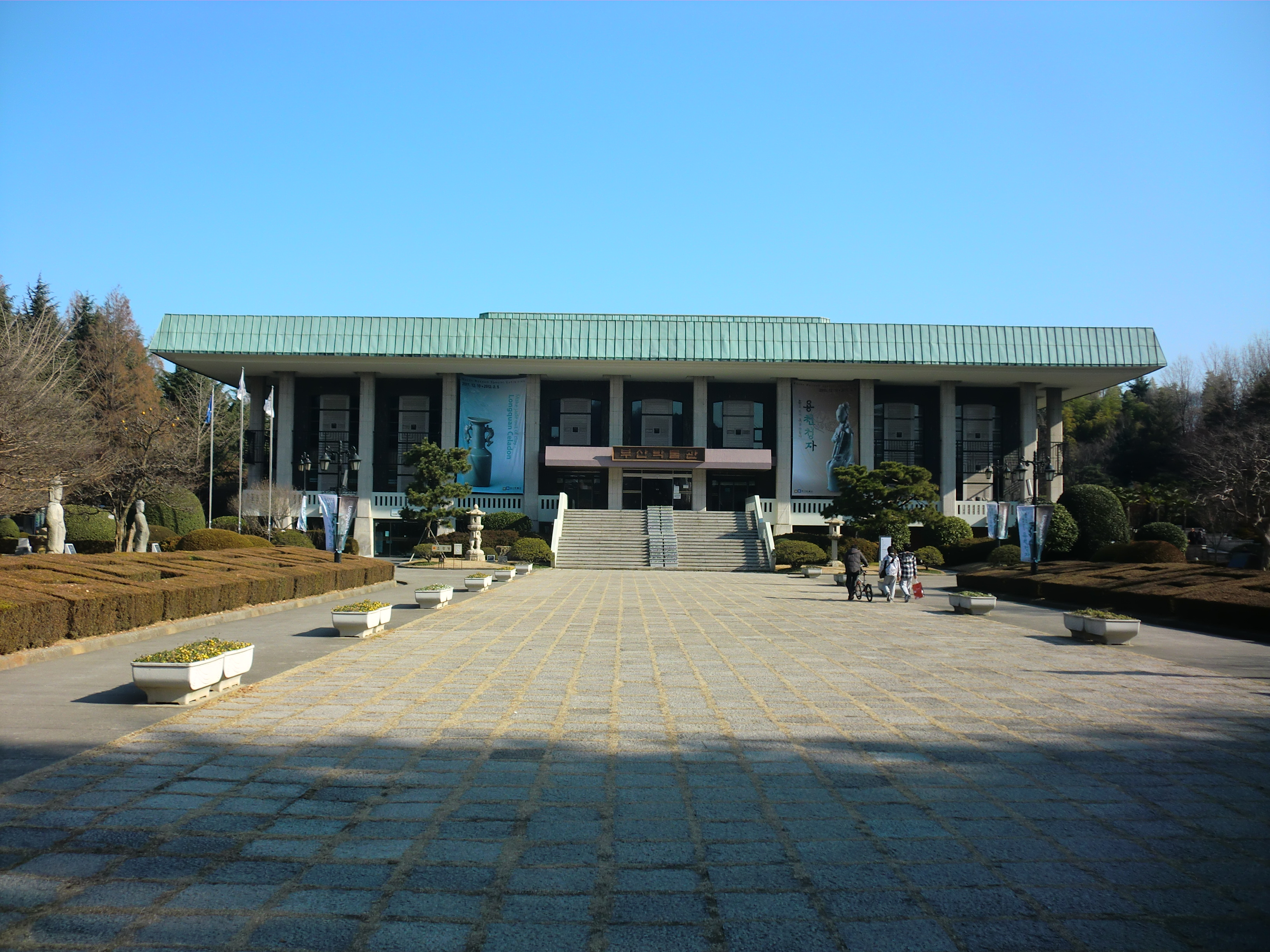
- Busan museum entrance
- Established: 1978
- Location: Busan Namgu Daeyeon 4 dong 948-1
- Coordinates: 35.1295900°N 129.0940500°E
- Type: Regional History Museum
- Director: Park Bang-ryong
- Website: Busan Museum

Busan Museum (Korean: 부산광역시립박물관) is a museum located in Busan, South Korea, open since 1978.

== History ==
The Busan Museum was designed to preserve the traditional culture of Busan through its collection of relics and historical art pieces. In 1995, it was founded as Busan Metropolitan Museum, and in May 2002, it was changed to Busan Museum following renovation and the opening of Exhibition Hall 2. A temporary capital memorial hall was opened in a detached building, which had previously served as the official residence of President Lee Myung-bak. The museum displays items that were left by Barley Mills and President Lee Seung Man and primarily preserves relics of the history of Busan. In October 1996, a Bokcheon, a detached building, was opened to exhibit excavated relics from the Bokcheon Ancient Tomb, a tomb representative of Busan culture during the Three Kingdoms period. Exhibition Hall 2 displays a wide variety of relics, ranging from the Prehistoric Age to modern-day. In July 2003, Busan's Modern Museum was opened, which features Busan historic event exhibits, and also contains relics from the Goguryeo–Sui War.

== Location, access, and facilities ==
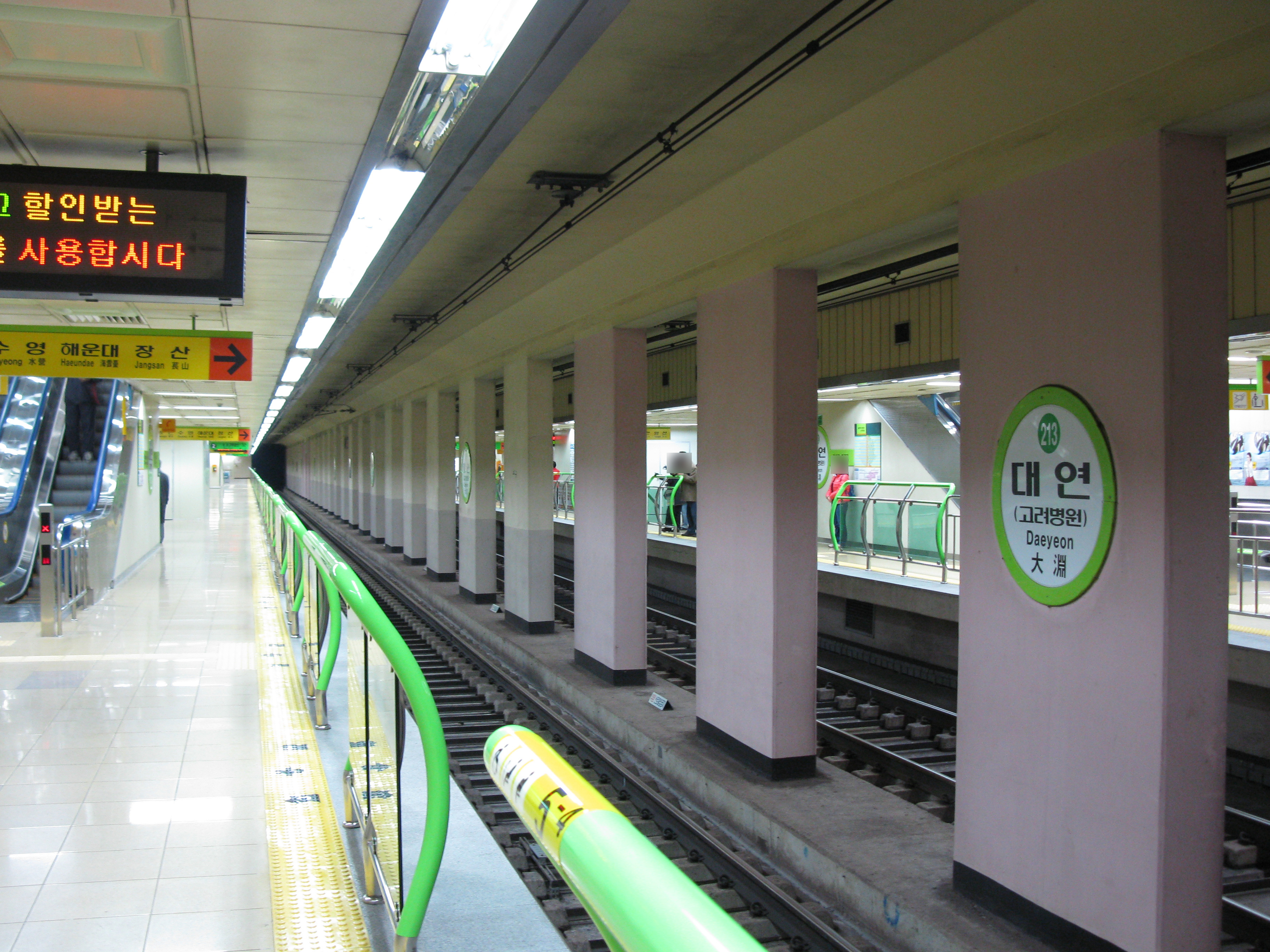
the subway stations view of Busan museum

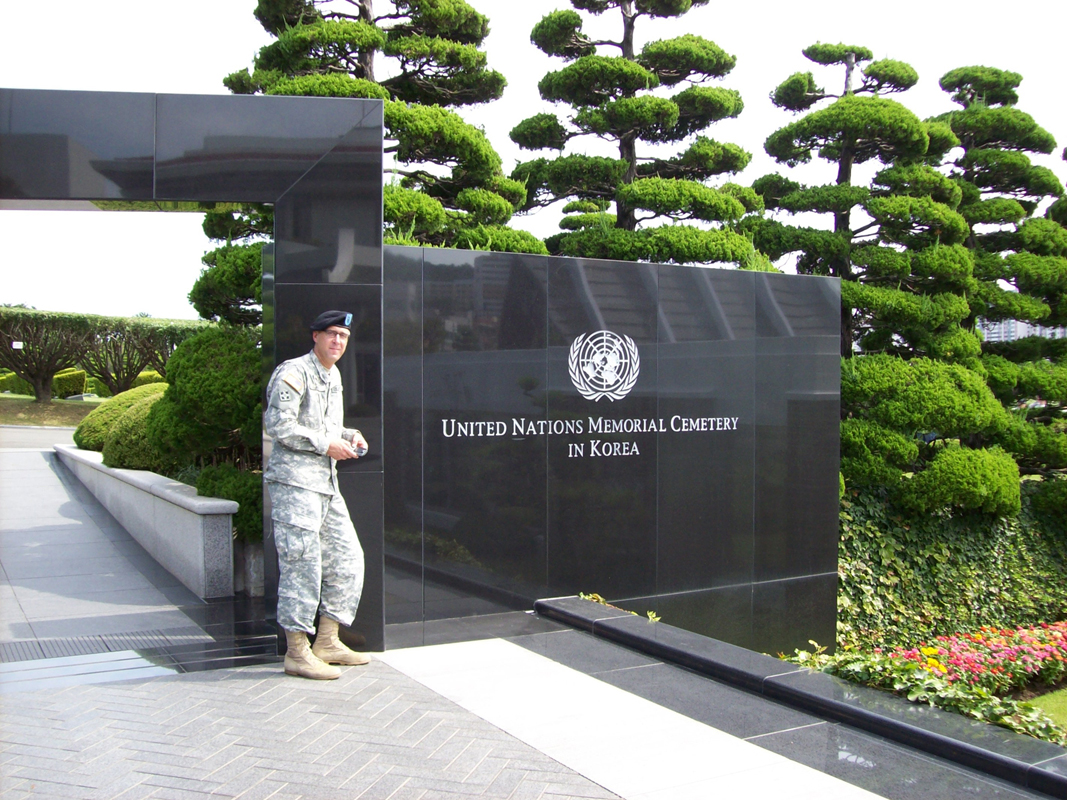
US army in UN commemoration park

The museum can be accessed by bus at the 'UN rotary' stop. By subway, the museum is close to Daeyeon Station, exit 3. From exit 3, the museum area is about 5 minutes away by foot.

In the museum region, there is a UN Memorial Park. In this park, there are several memorial related to the Korean War. This park is registered as cultural property of South Korea.

== Continuing programs and education ==
Ongoing programs include the museum history "adult and child lecture" program, which continues to run every year since 1985. The "moving cultural school" was started in 1993. There are courses held by great scholars by invitation, sightseeing guide, and ancient history courses offered to citizens.

== Collection ==
There are thirteen thousand relics in Busan museum. The typical relic is national treasure number 200, a Gilt-bronze Buddhist Saint standing statue created in the period of united Silla. Possession relics mainly come from Deokcheon-dong, No-po dong Ancient Tomb, Gimhaeeupseong Fortress in Busan and the Gyeonsang-Namdo region. The museum holds six thousand Burine cultural properties, seven hundred thirty emplettes, almost four thousand donations, and three hundred fifty collections. In exhibition, almost six hundred prehistoric age relics related to Busan are on display. A tower, statue of Buddha, and tombstone are on display in the outdoor exhibition hall.

=== A gilt-bronze Bodhisattva ===
National treasure number 200 is unusually tall (1.11 ft). The Buddhist Saint looks confidently to the front. There is a small hole in the forehead, where some hats may have existed originally.

=== Yu Sŏngnyong document ===
The Japanese Invasion of Korea occurred in 1592. At that time, Yu Sŏngnyong (1542–1607) took care of Chinese military who sent troops in South Korea. He submitted pending issue documents about South Korea. This is intangible cultural asset number 111 in Busan. Its size is 10 feet in width and 1.2 feet in height. The collection of writing, named 'Jinsimucha', which was published in 1663 include the whole contents. The valuable Yu Sŏngnyong documents reveal changes made during the 1663 publication and demonstrate Yu's will to overcome nationals' crisis.

=== Landscape and figure painting by Gim Hongdo ===
Painted by Gim Hongdo, an artist in the Joseon dynasty period, intangible cultural asset number 109 is 0.9 feet in height and 1.19 feet in width. Landscape and figure painting was inherited from Chinese artists and one of the Joseon artist group on the topic, "fisherman who is under a rampart of rock".

=== Kunyu Quantu ===
Intangible cultural asset number 114, Kunyu Quantu is a map of the world. Originally, the jesuit missionary Ferdinand Verbiest made a map of block book in 1674. It shows two hemispheres, the eastern and the western hemisphere. The meaning of Kunyu is 'a large ground' and its meaning was expended to 'earth'.

The Kunyu Ouantu on display was made in the Joseon dynasty period and based on Verbiest's draft, probably from the 18th century. Its size is 5.5 feet in height length and 12.7 feet in width. Busan museum's Kunyu Qunatu is the only one which is transcribed from 1674 block book when compared with other examples available.

=== Ban kok, Lee duk sung portrait ===
Number 1501 national treasure portrait was changed according to century, created in 1696. The Ban kok, Lee duk sung portrait show transition period between 17th century and 18th century. Its size is 5.4 feet in height and 3.24 feet in width. Sitting height length in portrait is 4.75 feet.

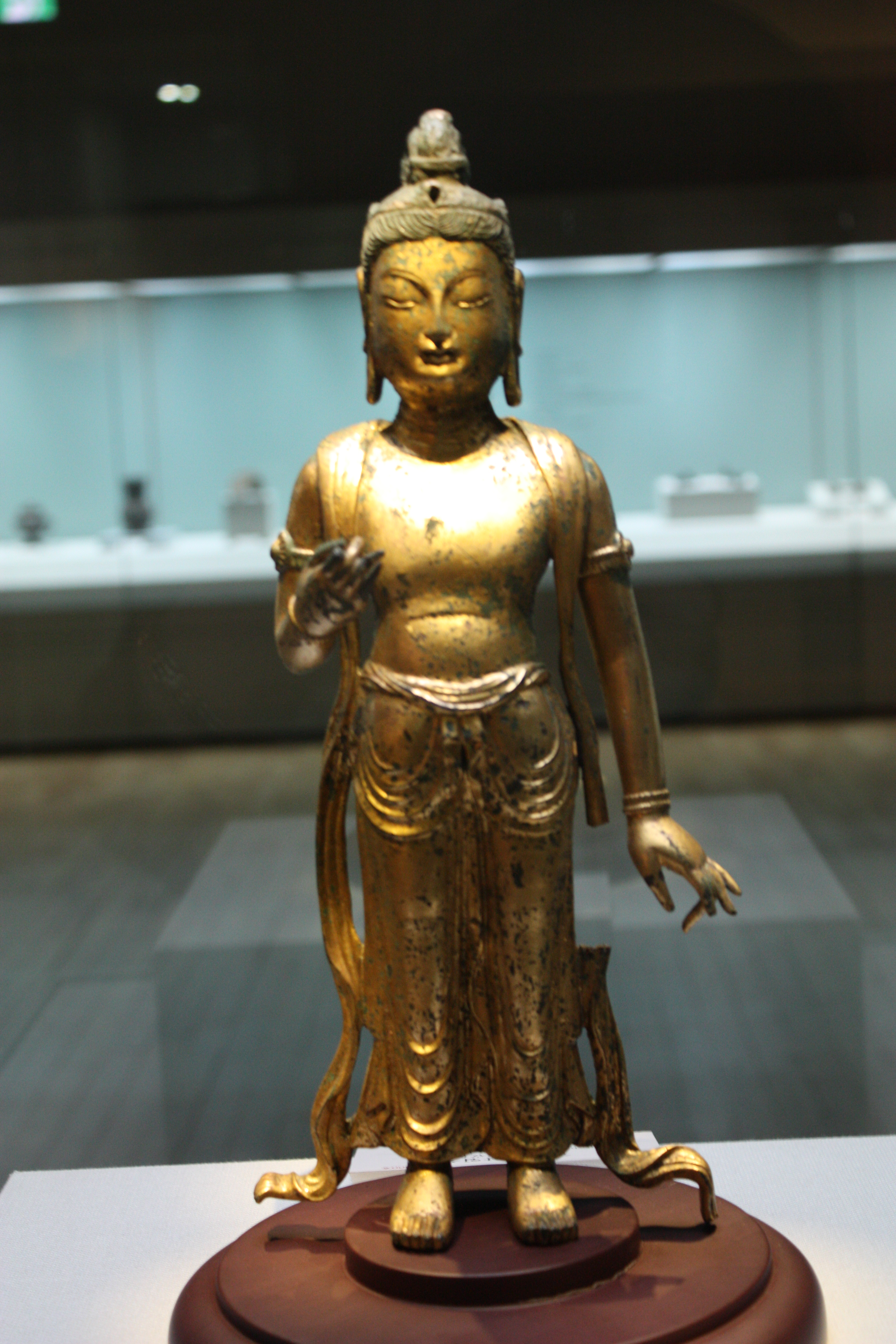
A gift brozen bodhisattva in Busann museum

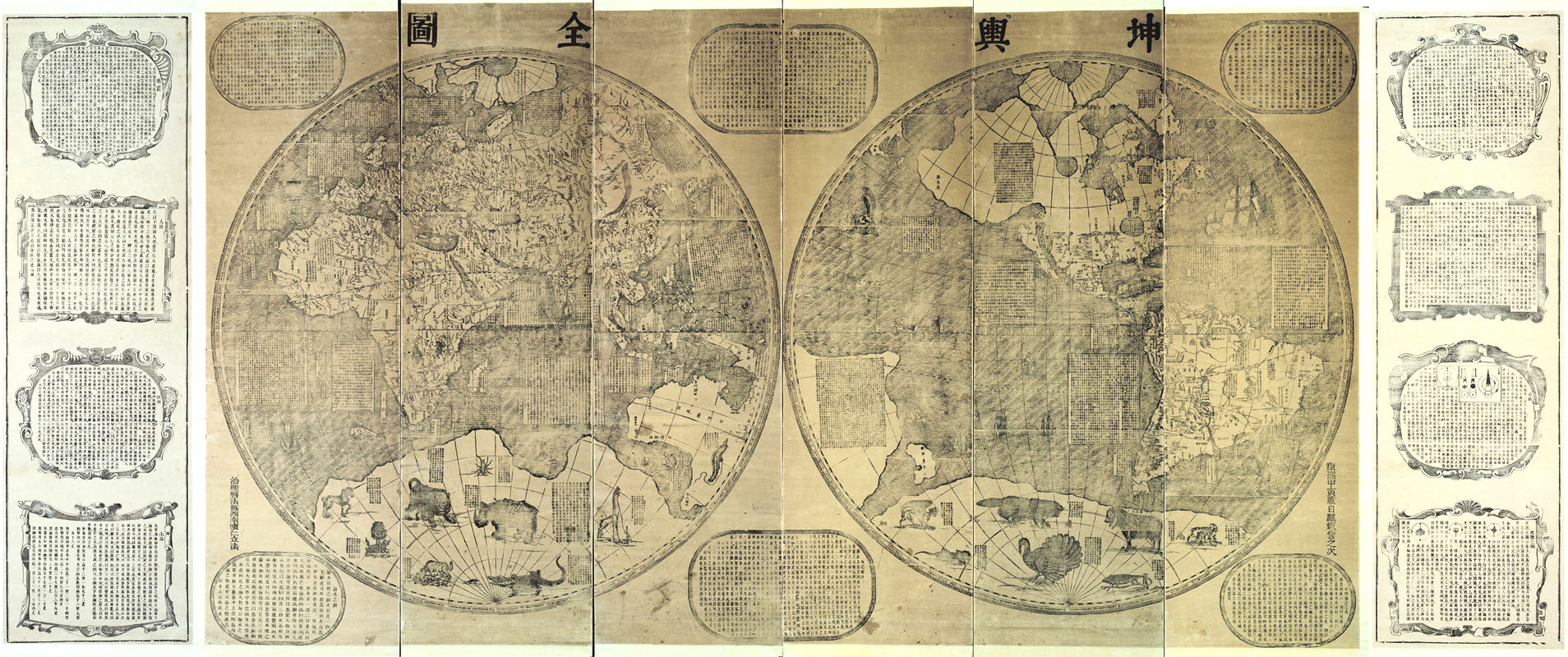
Ferdinand Verbiest's Kunyu Quantu
