= Sabatino de Ursis =

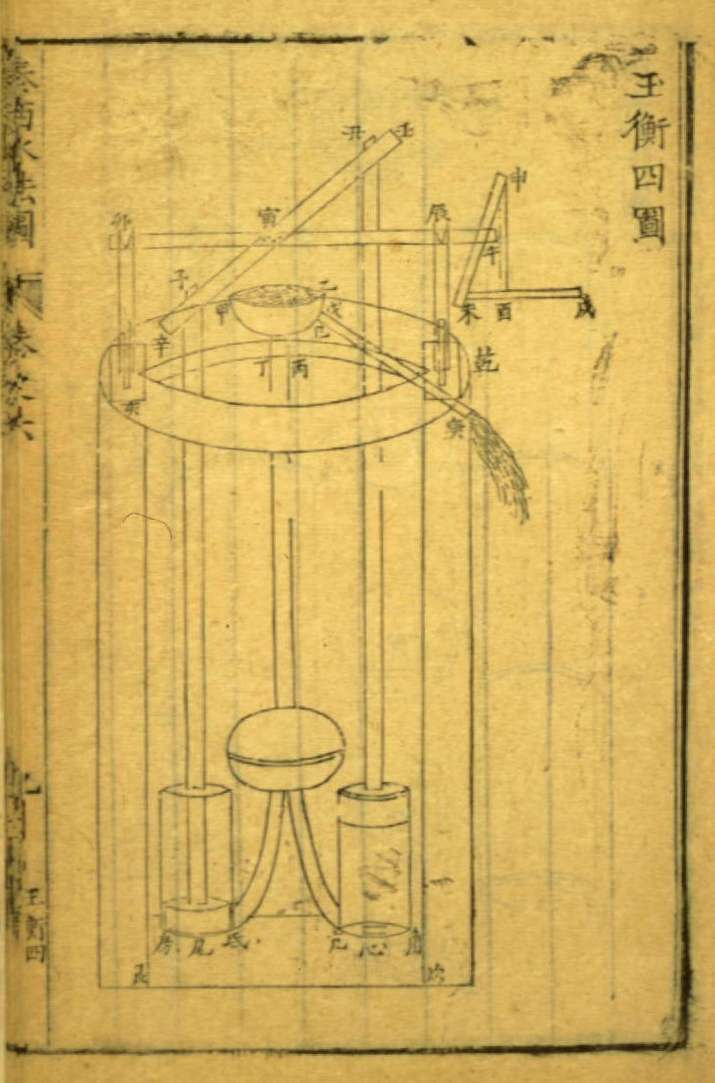
The 1612 book in Chinese on Western hydraulics, by Sabatino de Ursis. It describes a traditional European force pump.

Sabatino de Ursis (1575–1620, Chinese name: 熊三拔; pinyin: Xióng Sānbá) was an Italian Jesuit who was active in 17th-century China, during the Jesuit China missions.

== Career ==
Born in Lecce, Apulia, Sabatino de Ursis arrived in 1607 in Beijing, in order to help Matteo Ricci with astronomical research. He also worked together with Xú Guāngqĭ and Matteo Ricci on the translation of Euclid's Elements into Chinese, and with Ricci on the Zhifang waiji, China's first global atlas.

Sabatino de Ursis also wrote a book in Chinese on Western hydraulics, an example of the transmission of Western technical knowledge to China in the 17th century.

De Ursis is famous for having predicted an eclipse, which had not been foretold by traditional Chinese astronomers, on December 15, 1610. This was very important to the Chinese, and was a strong argument to let the Western Jesuits work on the reformation of the Chinese calendar. Soon, however, de Ursis and colleague Diego de Pantoja had to abandon the project in the face of opposition by Chinese astronomers.

In 1612, Sabatino translated orally a work by Agostino Ramelli on hydraulic mechanisms, which was put into Chinese by Xú Guāngqĭ. The book was published under the name 泰西水法 (Tàixī shuǐfǎ, Hydraulic machinery of the West).

In 1616, dislike of the Jesuits led to a persecution of Christians at the instigation of Shen Que (Shěn Què, 沈㴶, vice minister of rites in Nanking, d. 1624), and de Ursis was expelled to Macau, where he died in 1620:

"Presently the people have cleansed their doors [of Christian symbols]. They will not follow heterodox teachings again, and their restoration [to orthodoxy] is truly something to be glad about. Also, the gentry in Nanjing truly realizes that nobody can trust the crafty barbarians. Therefore, your servant may now speak clearly and fully of what concerns him. His only concern is that those who are far [removed from Nanjing] (i.e. living in Beijing) will not understand the actual situation and will continue to be deceived by the trivial learning [of Westerners] in Mathematics (shushu zhi xiaozhi). Furthermore, Diego de Pantoja and Sabatino de Ursis have been in Beijing for a long time. Their propaganda quickly spreads into the country; the rumours they spread are clever; [already] for a long time they have take, their liberties, and their contacts are many. These are aspects of the case which inevitably must cause concern."

— Second memorial by Shen Que, 1616.

At the renewed suggestion of Xu Guangqi, an Imperial edict of 1629 would again put the Jesuits in charge of the revision of the calendar, which would be handled by the German Jesuit Johann Schall.

== Publications ==
- Sabatino de Ursis and Xu Guangqi (1612) 泰西水法 (Thai Hsi Shui Fa, Hydraulic machinery of the West)
