= Wanguo Quantu =

1620s world map

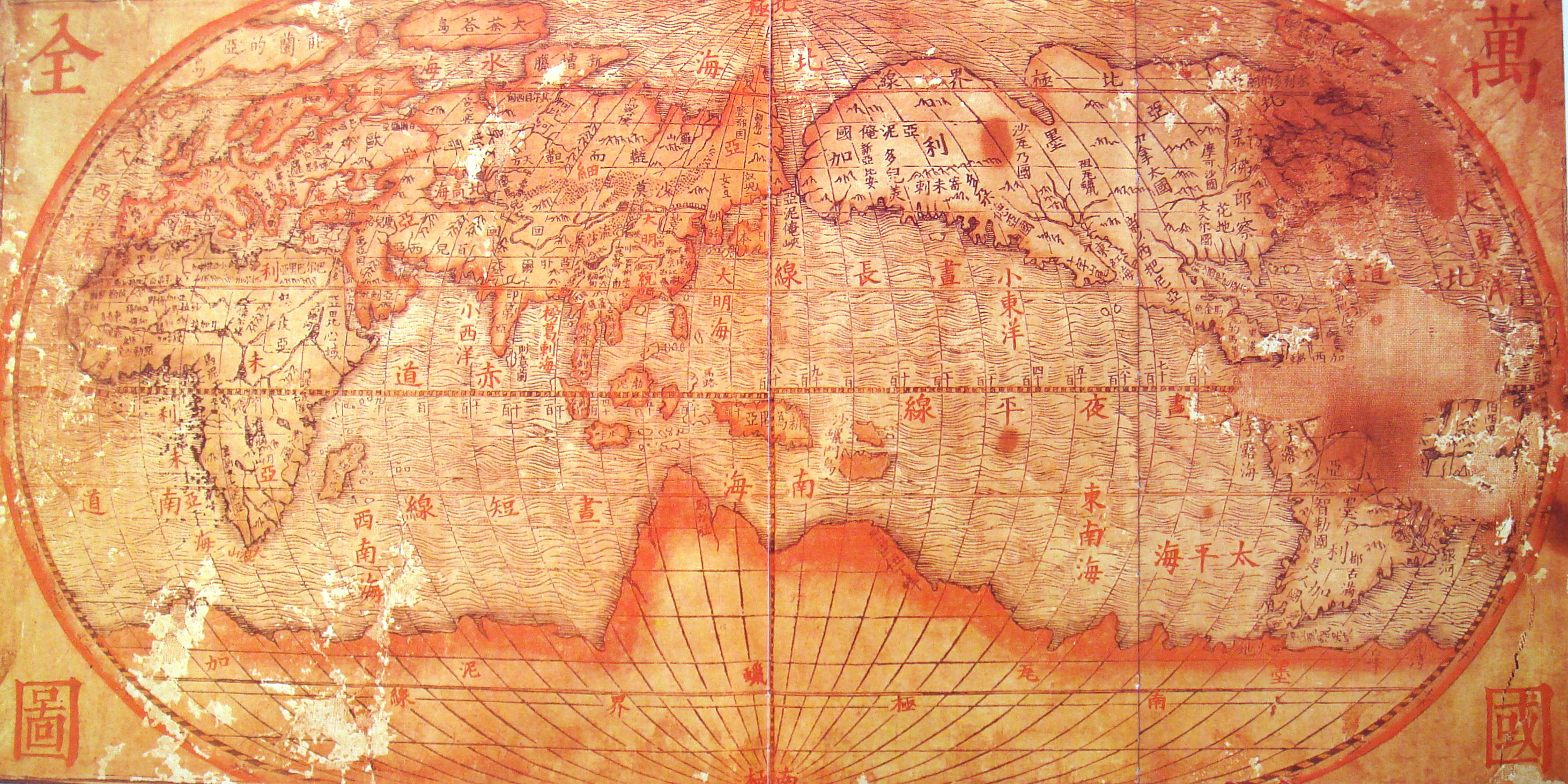
- The Wanguo Quantu
- Traditional Chinese: 萬國全圖
- Simplified Chinese: 万国全图
- Literal meaning: The Complete Map of the Myriad Countries; A Complete Map of the 10,000 States
Transcriptions
Standard Mandarin
- Hanyu Pinyin: Wànguó Quántú
- Wade–Giles: Wan-kuo Ch‘üan-t‘u

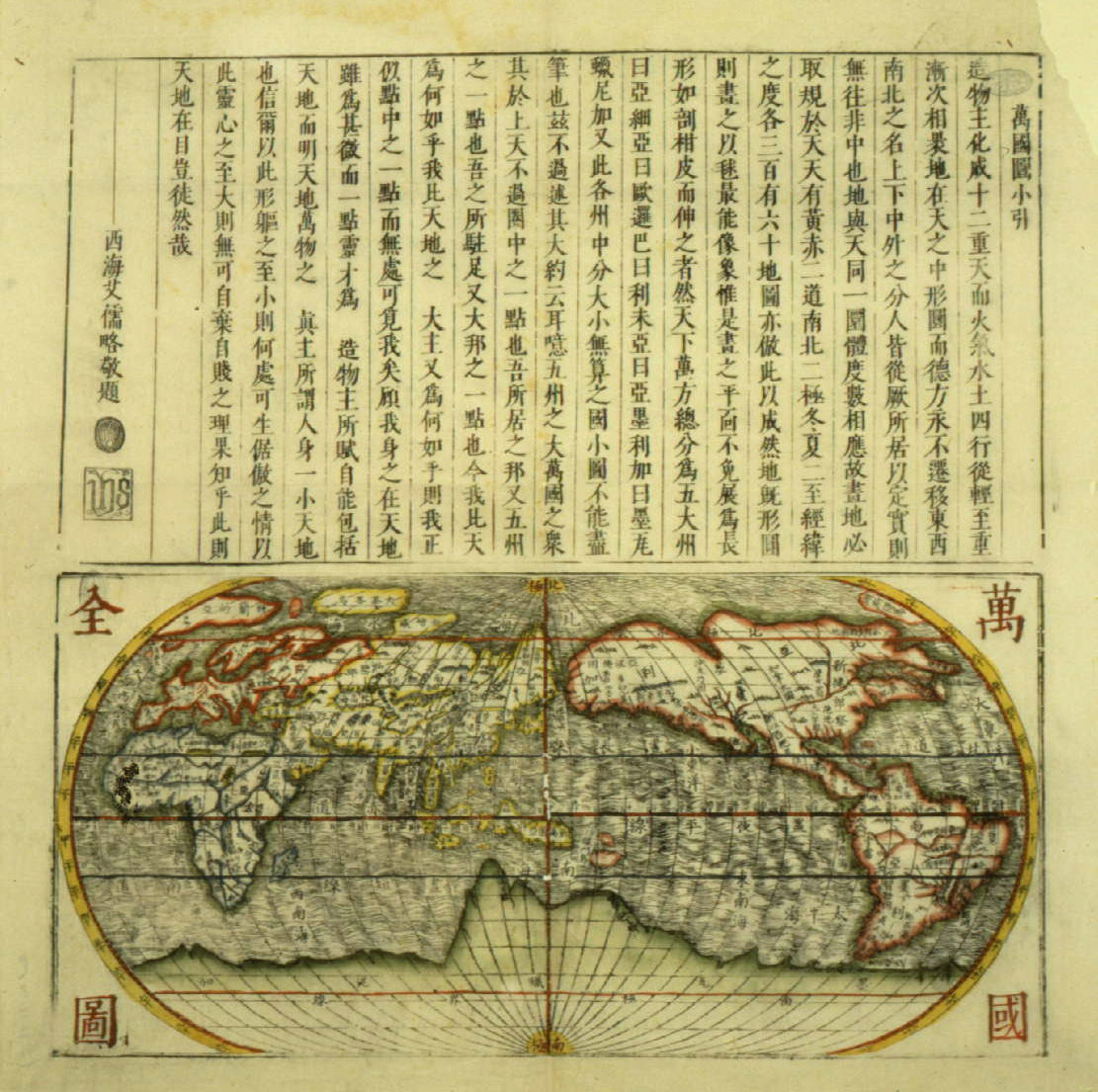
A Wanguo Quantu map, introduced by a notice written by Giulio Aleni, whose Chinese name appears in the signature in the last column on the left, above the Jesuit IHS symbol.

Wanguo Quantu or the Complete Map of the Myriad Countries is a map developed in the 1620s by the Jesuit Giulio Aleni in Ming China following the earlier work of Matteo Ricci, who was the first Jesuit to speak Chinese and to publish maps of the world in Chinese from 1574 to 1603. Aleni modified Ricci's maps to accommodate Chinese demands for a Sinocentric projection, placing the "Middle Kingdom" at the center of the visual field.

== See also ==
- Kunyu Wanguo Quantu, Matteo Ricci's 1602 world map.
- Shanhai Yudi Quantu, a contemporary Chinese map inspired by Matteo Ricci's work.
- Cheonhado, a contemporary Korean circular world map.
