= Zhifang Waiji =

17th century atlas by Italian Jesuits in China

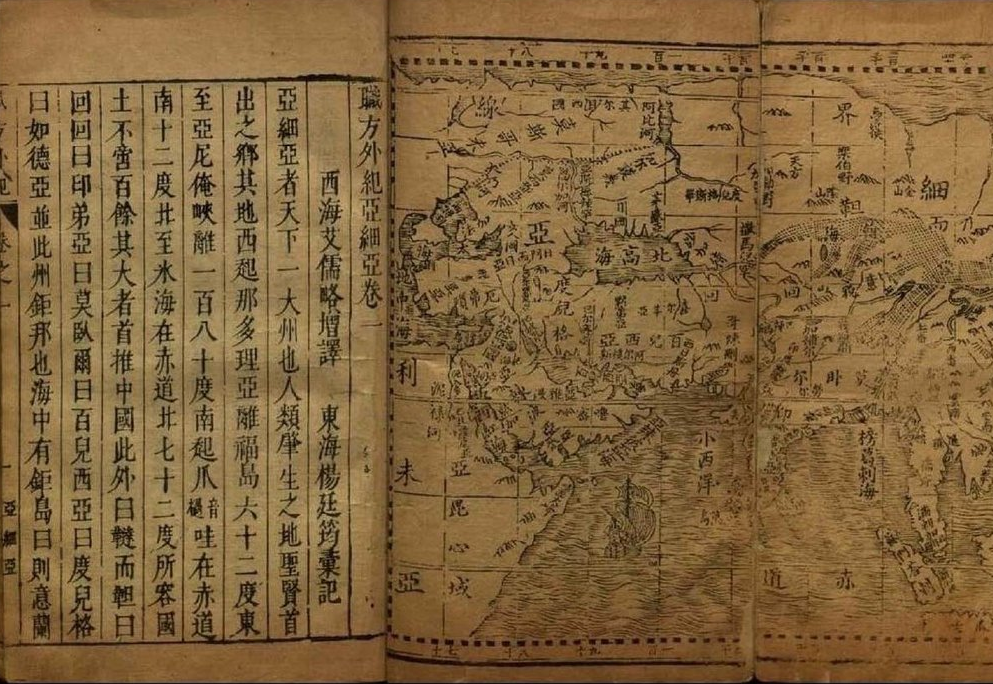
Pages from the Zhifang Waiji, showing the Eurasian Steppe and the Indian Ocean from the Horn of Africa to the Malay peninsula

The Zhifang Waiji (Chinese: 職方外紀; lit. 'Record of Foreign Lands') was an atlas written by various Italian Jesuits in Ming China in the early seventeenth century. The name literally refers to lands beyond the purview of the Zhifang Si, the Imperial cartography office. It was the first detailed atlas of global geography available in Chinese.

== Authorship ==
In the late 16th century, Western cartography was introduced to China by Matteo Ricci, who produced the Kunyu Wanguo Quantu, China's first world map, in 1602. The Wanli Emperor, who commissioned Ricci's map, subsequently ordered Ricci's colleagues Diego de Pantoja and Sabatino de Ursis to produce a book explaining the geography of the new countries shown; their work was eventually edited, compiled and revised by Giulio Aleni. In 1623, the book was finally published by Yang Tingyun in Hangzhou, and three years later was later reissued in a revised edition in Fujian.

== Content ==
The eight scrolls of the Zhifang Waiji divide the world into five continents, each with separate maps and descriptions. These are named as Asia, Europe, Libya (Africa), Americas, and Magellanica (Europe receives considerably more coverage than any other continent). An additional section covers the oceans. Ricci's original map had placed China off to one side, which resulted in a somewhat negative reception in Chinese scholarly circles; when Aleni and Yang published their version, they adjusted the design so that China occupied the centre of the world map. This small change made the Zhifang Waiji more popular, and it had a much longer and more wide-ranging influence than the Kunyu Wanguo Quantu as a result. Parts of the content of the book, in particular in the section of Europe, are renditions of the Geografia by Giovanni Antonio Magini.

== Cultural impact ==
The Zhifang Waiji was introduced to Korea by Jeong Duwon in 1631, a gift from the Jesuit translator João Rodrigues.

The book was introduced to Japan during the Edo period, but was initially banned because of its Christian authorship and its initial appearance in a collection of Christian writings. The ban was lessened in 1720 to allow works which did not directly relate to Christianity to be bought and sold, and the first "legitimate" sale of the book to Japan came in 1731. Despite the fact that only one edition was printed, it appears to have been widely read.

Much of the text was reused by Ferdinand Verbiest in 1674 for his Kunyu Tushuo (Explanation of the World Map), and it was reprinted in a number of collections, including Li Zhizao's Collection of Celestial Studies, the Siku Quanshu and a number of 19th and early 20th century encyclopedias.
