= Kunyu Quantu =

World map designed by Ferdinand Verbiest

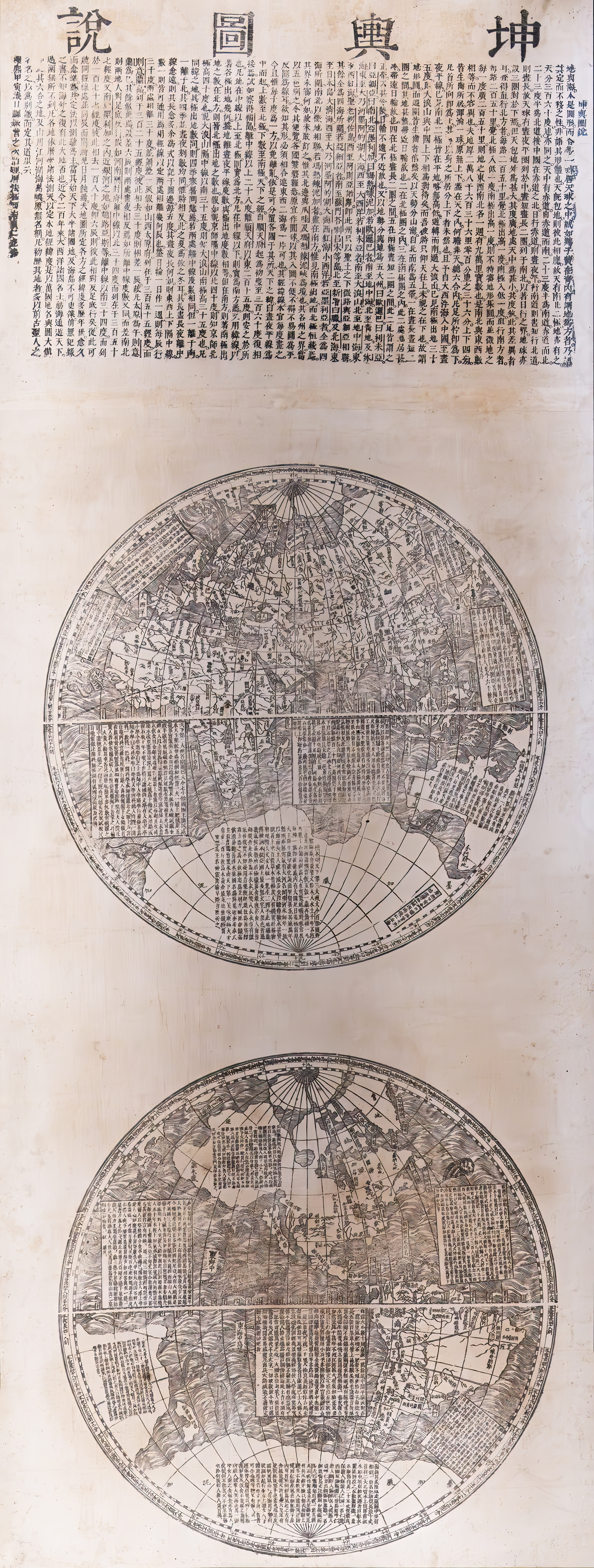
The Kunyu Quantu, 1672 version (Biblioteca Marciana Venice)

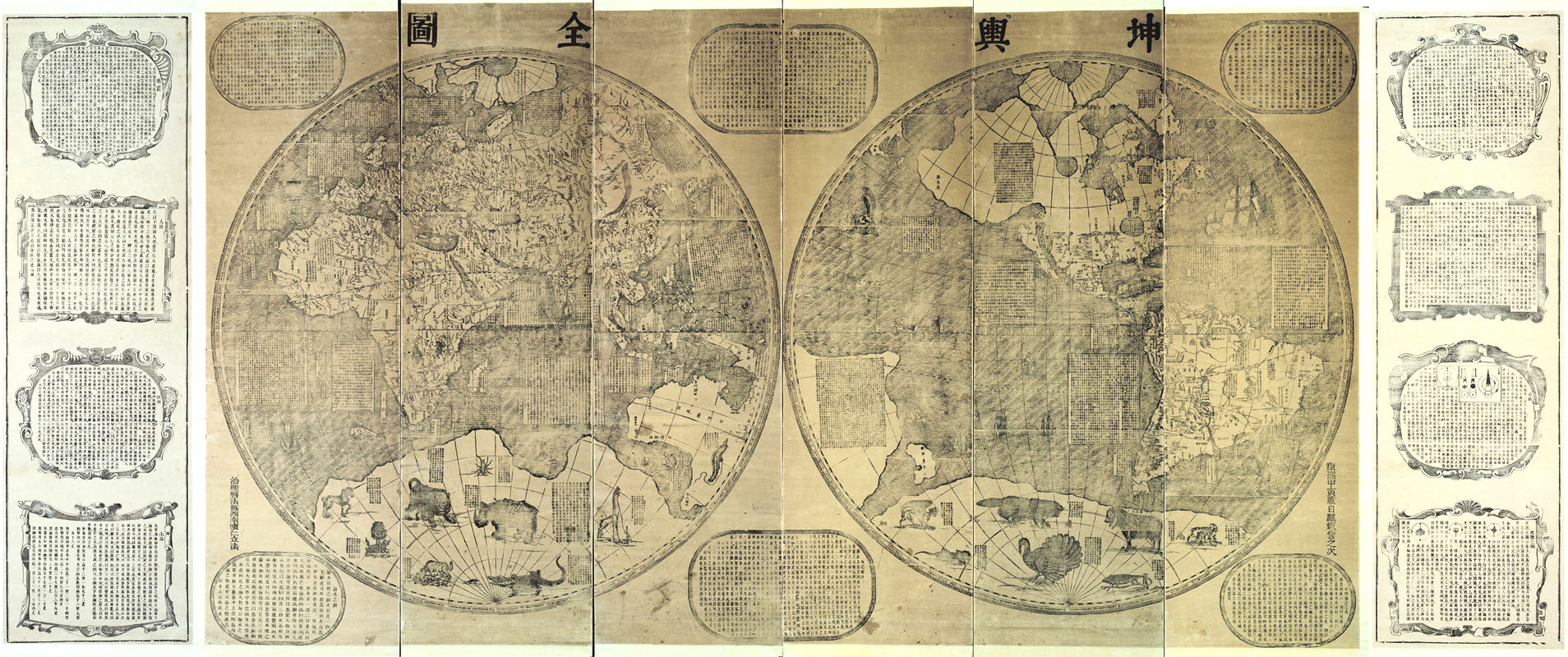
The Kunyu Quantu, 1674 version

The Kunyu Quantu (simplified Chinese: 坤舆全图; traditional Chinese: 坤輿全圖; pinyin: Kūnyú Quántú), or Full Map of the World, was a map of the world developed by Jesuit father Ferdinand Verbiest during his mission in China in 1674. A copy is kept at the Hunterian Museum, Glasgow.

The map follows the earlier works of Matteo Ricci, such as the Kunyu Wanguo Quantu.

== See also ==
- Wanguo Quantu
