= Shanhai Yudi Quantu =

1609 Chinese map

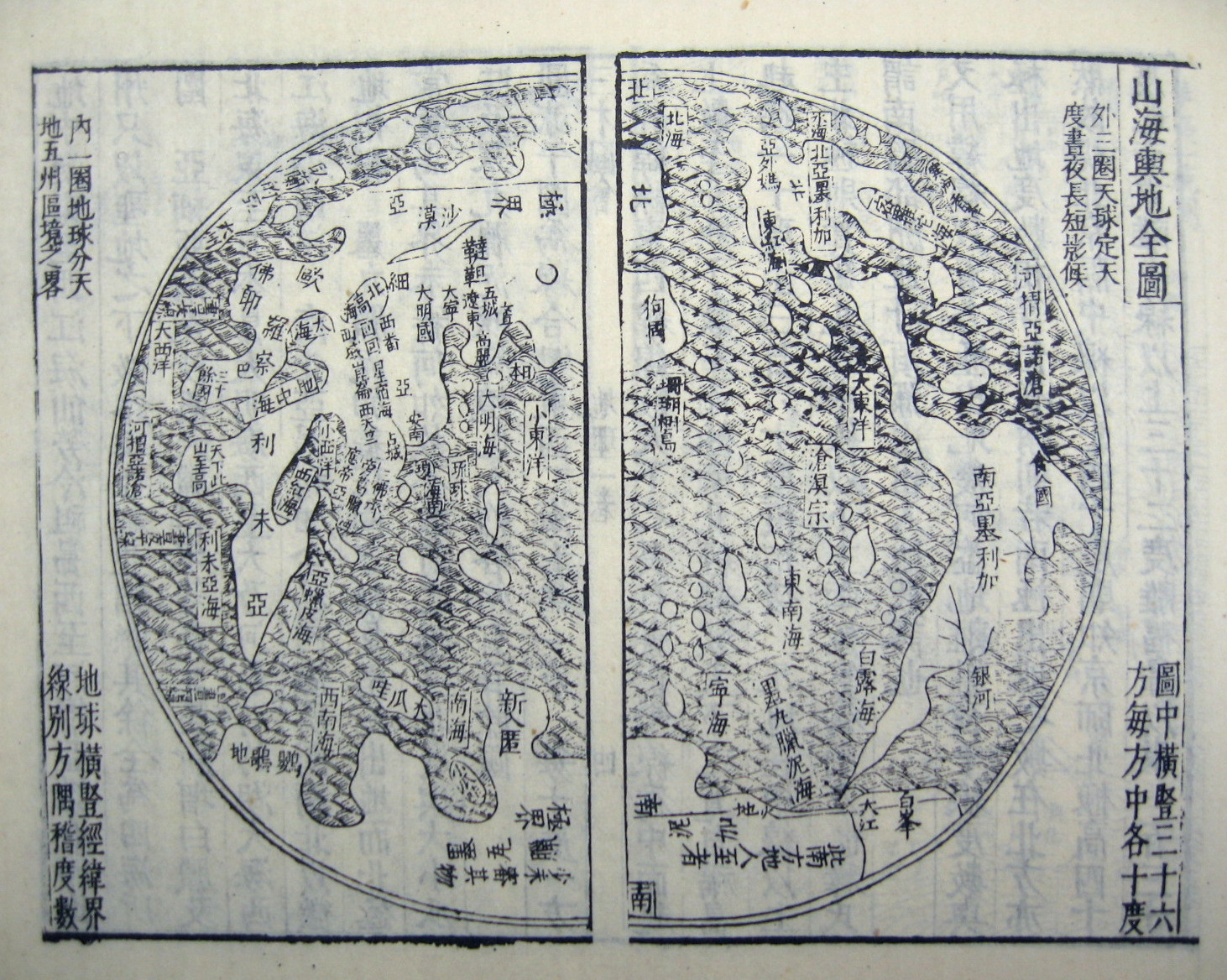
- Traditional Chinese: 山海輿地全圖
- Simplified Chinese: 山海舆地全图
- Literal meaning: Complete Terrestrial Map
Transcriptions
Standard Mandarin
- Hanyu Pinyin: shānhǎiyúdìquántú

The Shanhai Yudi Quantu (simplified Chinese: 山海舆地全图; traditional Chinese: 山海輿地全圖; pinyin: Shānhǎi Yúdì Quántú, "Complete Terrestrial Map") is a Ming dynasty Chinese map published in 1609 in the leishu encyclopedia Sancai Tuhui.

== Influences ==
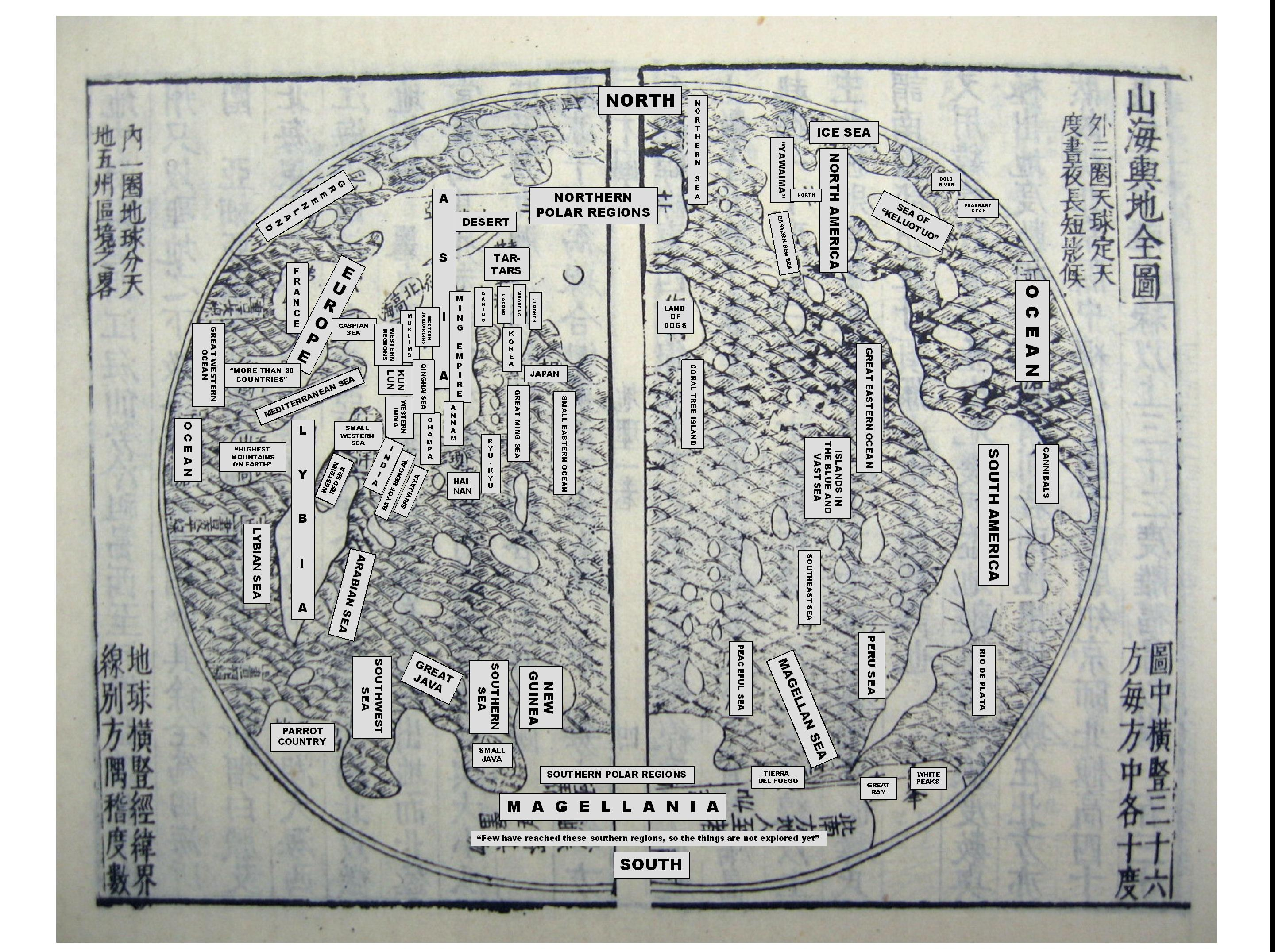
The map with translations in English from Roderich Ptak's "The Sino-European Map"

The Shanhai Yudi Quantu is known to have been highly influenced by the Jesuit missions in China, starting with the work of Matteo Ricci. Matteo Ricci himself had two of his own maps entitled Shanhai Yudi Quantu: one engraved by Wu Zhongming (吳中明, Wú Zhōngmíng) and dated 1600 and another engraved by Guo Zizhang (郭子章, Gūo Zĭzhāng) and dated 1604.

== Description ==
=== Asia ===
The Asian continent is marked phonetically 亞細亞 (Modern Pinyin Yàxìyà, Middle Chinese Aseja). This is the area of the map where most information can be found, and has been subdivided here by regions:

==== East Asia ====
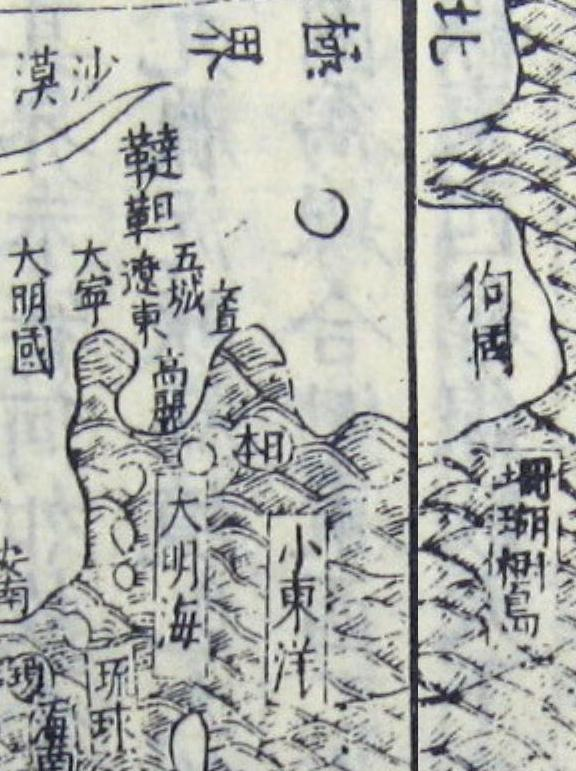
Detail of East Asia

Numerous areas and islands are named in this part of the world:

- The Great Ming Empire (大明國, Dà Míngguó)
- Japan (日本, Rìběn)
- Goryeo Korea (高麗, Gāolì)
- The Jurchen Manchurians (女直, Rǚzhí)
- "Five Cities" near Sungari (五城, Wǔ Chéng)
- Liaodong (遼東, Liáodōng)
- Daning, a military region (大寧, Dà Níng)
- Tartary, north of Liaodong (韃靼, Dádá)
- "Dogland", a land of dog-headed men in eastern Siberia (狗國, Gǒugúo)
- "Coral Tree Island" (珊瑚樹島, Shānhúshù Dǎo)
- Ryukyu Islands (琉球, Liúqiú)
- Siberia (北極界, Běijíjiè, lit. "Arctic Region")

The seas beside East Asia are the South China Sea (大明海, lit. "Great Ming Sea") and the "Lesser Eastern Ocean" (小東洋, Xiǎo Dōng Yáng). To the north is the "Ice Sea" (冰海, Bīng Hǎi).

==== West Asia ====
- Gobi Desert (沙漠, lit. "The Sandy Wastes", which has become the Chinese word for "Desert")
- Kham Tibetans (西番, Xī Fān, lit. "The Western Barbarians")
- Muslims (回回, Huíhuí)
- Western Regions (西域, Xīyù)
- Qinghai (星宿海, Xīngsù Hǎi, lit. "Starry Sea" or 北高海, Běi Gāo Hǎi, lit. "Northern High Sea")
- The Kunlun Range (崑崙, Kūnlún)

==== South Asia ====
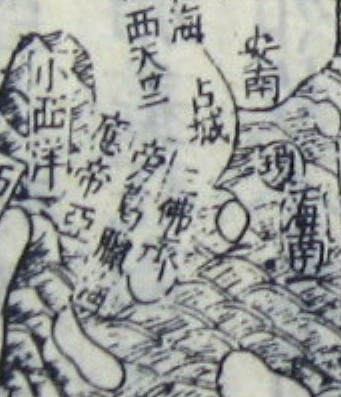
Detail of Southern Asia

- Annam in Vietnam (安南, lit. "The Pacified South")
- Champa (占城, Zhànchéng)
- Hainan (海南, Hǎinán)
- Srivijaya (三佛齊, Modern Pinyin Sānfóqí, Middle Chinese Sambiutjay)
- India (應帝亞, Yīngdìyà)
- Western India (西天竺, Xī Tiānzhú)

Two seas are shown: the Bay of Bengal (旁葛臘海, Pánggélà Hǎi) and "Lesser Western Ocean" (小西洋, Xiǎo Xī Yáng).

Java is shown in two pieces – Major (大爪哇, Dà Zhǎowā) and Minor (小爪哇, Xiǎo Zhǎowā) – far into the "Southwest" (西南海) and "Southern" (南海) Seas near the Antarctic.

=== Europe ===
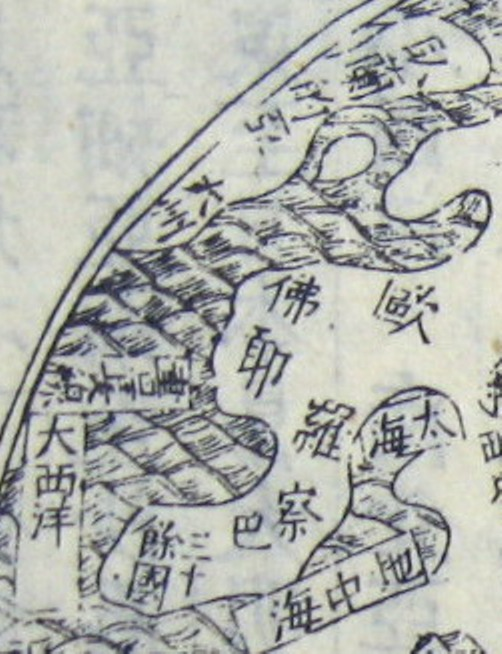
Depiction of Europe in the Shanhai Yudi Quantu

Europe is marked phonetically as 歐羅巴 (Modern Pinyin Ōuluóbā, Middle Chinese Oulapa).

- France (佛郎察, Fólǎngchá)
- "More than thirty countries" (三十餘國, sānshí yú gúo)
- Greenland (臥蘭的亞, Wòlándìyà from Latin 'Groenlandia')

Europe is surrounded by the "Greater Western Ocean" (大西洋, Dà Xī Yáng, a body of water formerly located east of Rome and conflated with the Indian Ocean but now appropriately placed in the Atlantic), the Mediterranean (地中海, Dìzhōng Hǎi), and the Black Sea (太海, Tài Hǎi, lit. "Great Sea").

=== North America ===
North America is marked as "北亞墨利加" (Modern Pinyin Běi Yàmèilìjiā, Middle Chinese Pok Amoklika). The only location is marked phonetically and is unknown:

- "Angwayma" (亞外媽, Yàwàimā)

Another two unknown locations are on an island to America's northeast, possibly the inhabited southwest coast of Greenland:

- "Cold River" (寒河, Hán Hé)
- "Fragrant Peak" (香峯, Xiāngfēng)

The Gulf of California is marked as the "Eastern Red Sea" (東紅海, Dōng Hóng Hǎi) and the "Ice Sea" continues across the north.

=== South America ===
South America is marked as "南亞墨利加" (Modern Pinyin Nán Yàmèilìjiā, Middle Chinese Nom Amoklika).

- "Land of the Cannibals" (食人國, Shírén Guó)
- Rio de la Plata (銀河, Yín Hé)

Surrounding it are the Atlantic Ocean (marked as "Oceano" 河摺亞諾滄, Hézhéyànuò Cāng) to the northeast, the "Sea of Peru" (白露海, Bólù Hǎi) to the west, and the "Greater Eastern Ocean" (大東洋, Dà Dōng Yáng).

=== Libya ===
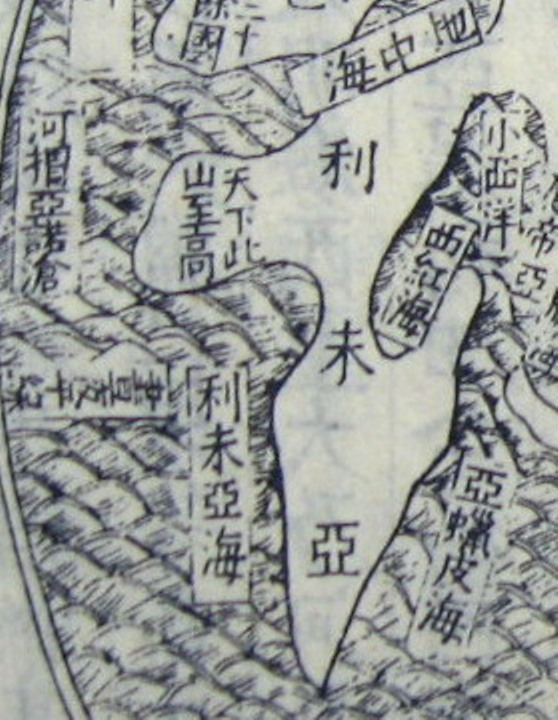
Portion of the map depicting Africa

Following classical geography, the continent of Africa is marked phonetically as "Libya" (利未亞, Lìwèiyà).

- Atlas Mountains (described as 天下此山至高, Tiānxià cǐ shān zhìgāo, "The highest mountain under Heaven")

Africa is surrounded by several seas. From the north, clockwise: the Mediterranean; the "Lesser Western Ocean" (小西洋, Xiǎo Xī Yáng) in the Persian Gulf and Arabian Sea; the Red Sea, called the "Western Red Sea" (西紅海, Xī Hóng Hǎi) to distinguish it from the Gulf of California); the western Indian Ocean, called the "Arabian Sea" (亞蠟皮海, Modern Pinyin Yàlàpí Hǎi, Middle Chinese Alapbie Hoy); the Gulf of Guinea, called the "Libyan Sea" (利未亞海, Lìwèiyà Hǎi); and the Atlantic Ocean (again marked as "Oceano" 河摺亞諾滄, Hézhéyànuò Cāng).

=== Magallania ===
The still-uncertain Terra Australis – today Australia, Antarctica, New Zealand, and other islands – is marked phonetically as 墨瓦臘泥加 (Modern Pinyin Mèiwǎlàníjiā, Middle Chinese Mokngwalapneka). This transliterates the name "Magallanica", a name given to the prospective continent at the time in honor of Ferdinand Magellan, who had crossed past Tierra del Fuego and shown the southern continent (hypothesized since Ptolemy) to be separate from South America.

The map notes how little is known about this continent – "Few have reached these southern regions. Things are not explored yet" (此南方地人至者少, 未審其物) – but also includes more placenames in it than in Africa, America, or Europe:

- "White Peak" (白峯, Bái Fēng)
- "Great River" (大江, Dà Jiāng)
- Tierra del Fuego (火地, Huǒdì lit. "Place of Fire")
- Antarctica (南極界, Nánjíjiè, lit. "Antarctic Region")
- New Guinea (新入匿, Xīn Rùnì)
- "Place of Parrots" (鸚哥地, generally taken as Australia from a later name but originally referring to a location south of Africa, possibly Madagascar)

== Legacy ==
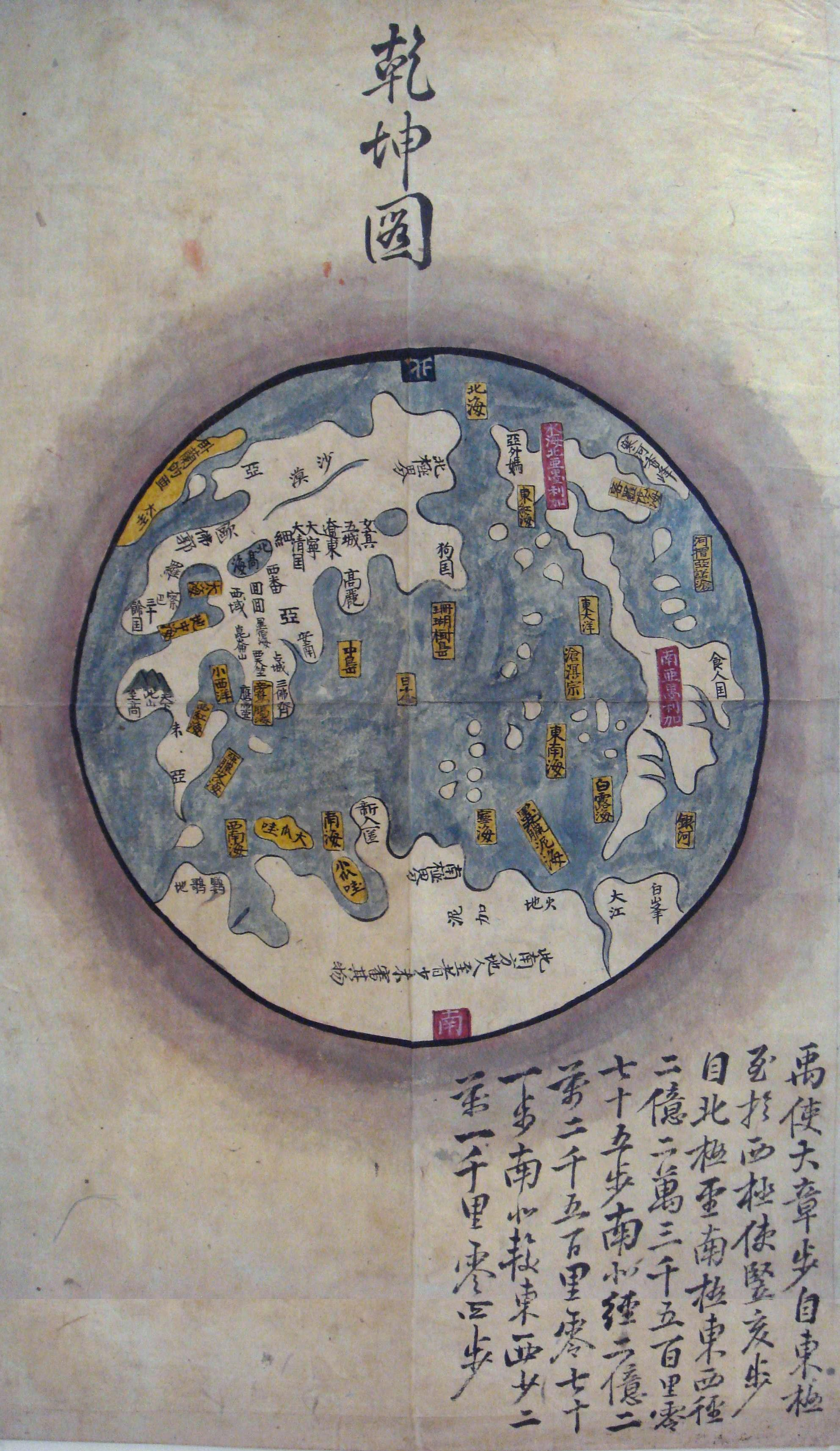
A Korean map from the 1800s, entitled "Map of Heaven and Earth" (乾坤圖)

A large number of maps were derived from the Shanhai Yudi Quantu, many of them are found today in Japanese and Korean archives, but their history is generally difficult to reconstruct.

== See also ==
- Chinese geography
- Cheonhado
- Kunyu Wanguo Quantu, Matteo Ricci's map
