= Sancai Tuhui =

1609 Chinese encyclopedia

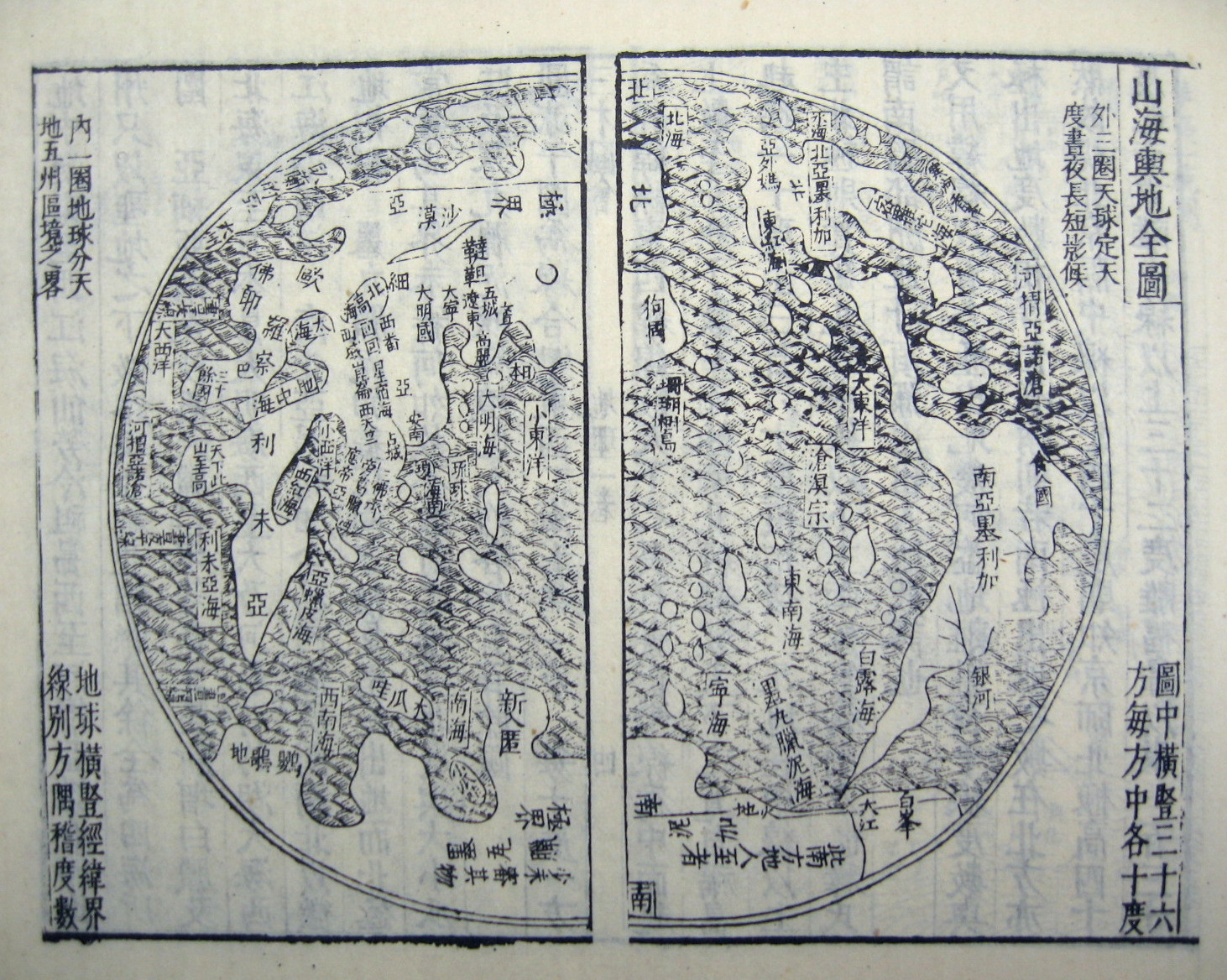
- The world map Shanhai Yudi Quantu in Sancai Tuhui
- Traditional Chinese: 三才圖會
- Simplified Chinese: 三才图会
- Hanyu Pinyin: Sāncái Túhuì
- Literal meaning: collection of illustrations of the three realms
Transcriptions
Standard Mandarin
- Hanyu Pinyin: Sāncái Túhuì
- Gwoyeu Romatzyh: Santsair Twuhuey
- Wade–Giles: San^{1}-tsʻai^{2} Tʻu^{2}-hui^{4}
- IPA: [sán.tsʰǎɪ tʰǔ.xwêɪ]
Yue: Cantonese
- Jyutping: saam1 coi4 tou4 wui6

Sancai Tuhui (Chinese: 三才圖會, san-TS'EYE TOO-khwey), compiled by Wang Qi (Chinese: 王圻) and his son Wang Siyi (王思義), is a Chinese leishu encyclopedia, completed in 1607 and published in 1609 during the late Ming dynasty, featuring illustrations of subjects in the three worlds of heaven, earth, and humanity. The work contains a large number of posthumous and contemporary depictions of Chinese emperors.

== Title ==
The title of this encyclopedia has been variously translated into English as "Illustrations of the Three Powers", "Collected Illustrations of the Three Realms", "Pictorial Compendium of the Three Powers", and others; in the original title, "Sancai" (三才) refers to the three realms of "heaven, earth, and man", and "Tuhui" (圖會) means "collection of illustrations".

== Description ==
This encyclopedia is organized into 106 chapters in 14 categories (astronomy, geography, biographies, history, biology, and such), with text and illustrations for the articles. Reproductions of this encyclopedia are still in print in China.

While it contains some inaccurate or mythological articles (for example, the articles on the horseshoe crab and the crane), it also distinguished itself from the common "everyday encyclopedias" (日用類書, riyong leishu) at that time by being accurate in some other articles (for example, accurate depictions of the Japanese, Korean and Vietnamese people's clothing, and a very accurate world map (the Shanhai Yudi Quantu).

== See also ==
- Song Yingxing
- Wakan Sansai Zue - A Japanese encyclopedia inspired by the Chinese Sancai Tuhui
