= Diego de Pantoja =

Spanish Jesuit and missionary to China (1571-1618)

The Reverend Diego de Pantoja SJ
- Born: 24 April 1571; Valdemoro, Spain
- Died: 9 July 1618 (aged 47); Portuguese Macau
- Occupation: Musician, missionary

Signature
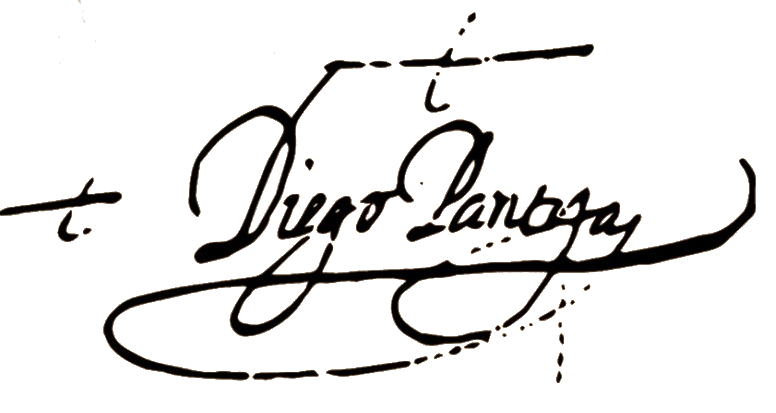

Diego de Pantoja, SJ (Chinese: 龐迪我, Pang Diwo; April 1571, Valdemoro, Spain – 9 July 1618, Portuguese Macau, China) was a Spanish Jesuit and missionary to China who is best known for having accompanied Matteo Ricci in Beijing. His name also appears in some sources as Didaco Pantoia.

== Biography ==
He joined the Society of Jesus in 1589. He studied at the Plasencia College.

He arrived in Portuguese Macau on 20 July 1597, where he received his final instructions for his work in China at St. Paul's College. He was then sent to the Ming dynasty's southern capital, Nanjing, where he stayed from March 1600. He worked with Matteo Ricci, who later completed his work on the Zhifang waiji, China's first global atlas. Together, they left Nanjing on 19 May 1600, and arrived at the Ming dynasty's Northern and overall capital, Beijing, on 24 January 1601.

He was the first Westerner to enter the Forbidden City.

He worked in Beijing for many years, including as a musician, astronomer (with calendar corrections) and as a geographer (working with latitude). He was able to obtain some land to create a Jesuit cemetery.

In 1614 he published Qi Ke which looked at ethics and culture of Catholicism in China.

On 18 March 1617 he was tried as an enemy of the Chinese astronomers and was expelled from China, along with his colleague Sabatino de Ursis, and settled in Macao, where he lived for the short time remaining before his death.

In recent years, the life and legacy of Diego de Pantoja have become more relevant the government of the People's Republic of China welcomed the Cervantes Institute's proposal and decreed 2018 as "Diego de Pantoja Year" to mark his 400th death anniversary.

== Literature ==
- Ignacio Ramos Riera: Diego de Pantoja. Dalla Spagna alla Cina: La Civiltà Cattolica 4067/4 (2019), 484–492. ISSN 0009-8167
- L. Carrington Goodrich & Chao-Ying Fang (ed.): Dictionary of Ming Biography, 2 ed., New York/London: Columbia University Press 1976
- Gianni Criveller: Preaching Christ in Late Ming China: The Jesuits' Presentation of Christ from Matteo Ricci to Giulio Aleni, Taipei:Taipei Ricci Institute 1997 ISBN 2-910969-02-9
- Trigault, Nicolas S. J. "China in the Sixteenth Century: The Journals of Mathew Ricci: 1583-1610". English translation by Louis J. Gallagher, S.J. (New York: Random House, Inc. 1953). This is an English translation of the Latin work, De Christiana expeditione apud Sinas based on Matteo Ricci's journals completed by Nicolas Trigault. Ricci and Pantoja's trip to Beijing is described on pp. 354–399. There is also full Latin text available on Google Books.

== See also ==
- Jesuit China missions
