= Giulio Alenio =

Italian Jesuit missionary and scholar (1582–1649)

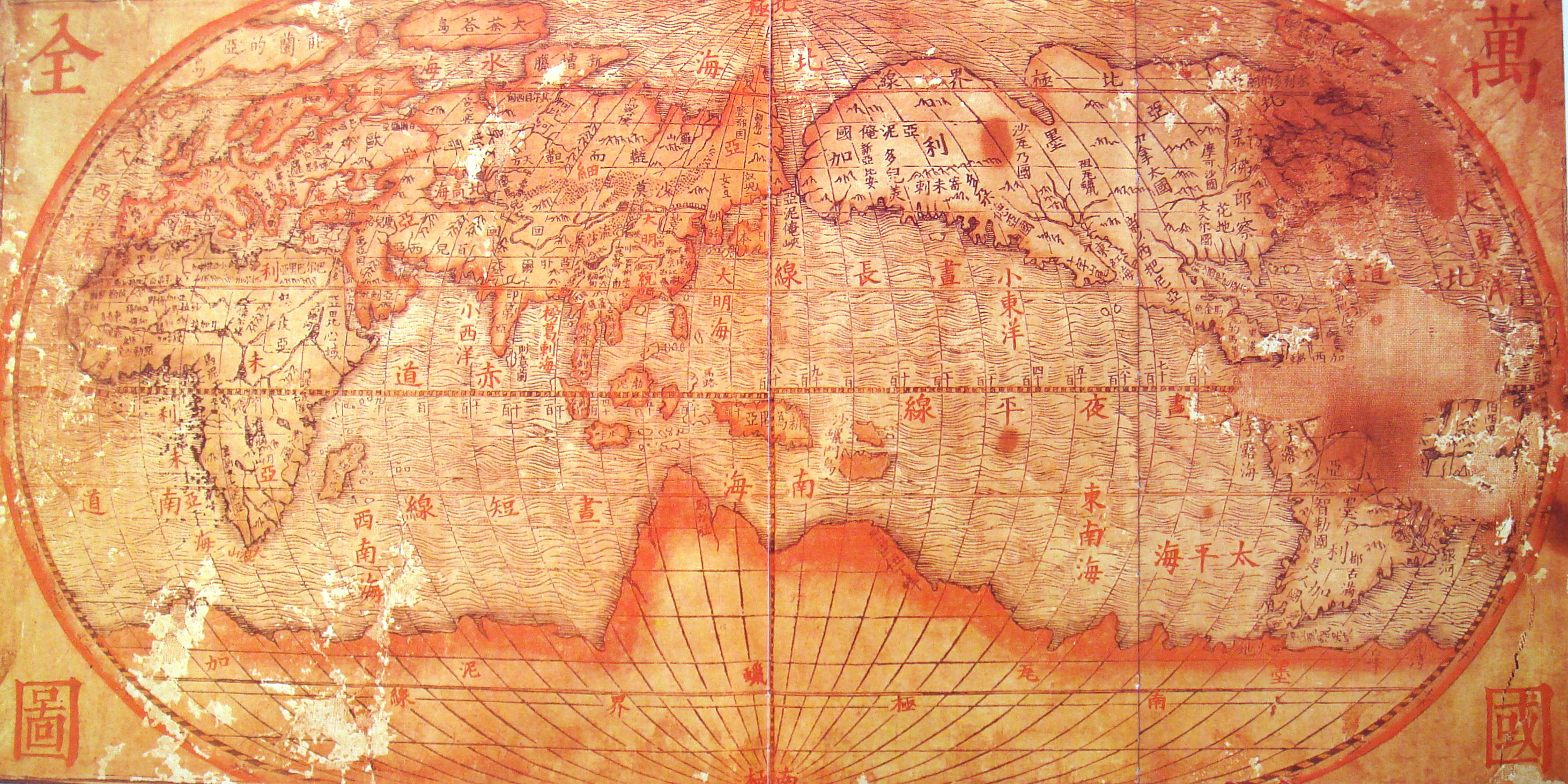
- Aleni's Sinocentric Complete Map of the Myriad Countries
- Traditional Chinese: 艾儒略
Transcriptions
Standard Mandarin
- Hanyu Pinyin: Ài Rúlüè
- Wade–Giles: Ai^{4} Ju^{2}-lüeh^{4}
Yue: Cantonese
- Jyutping: Ngaai⁶ Jyu⁴-loek⁶

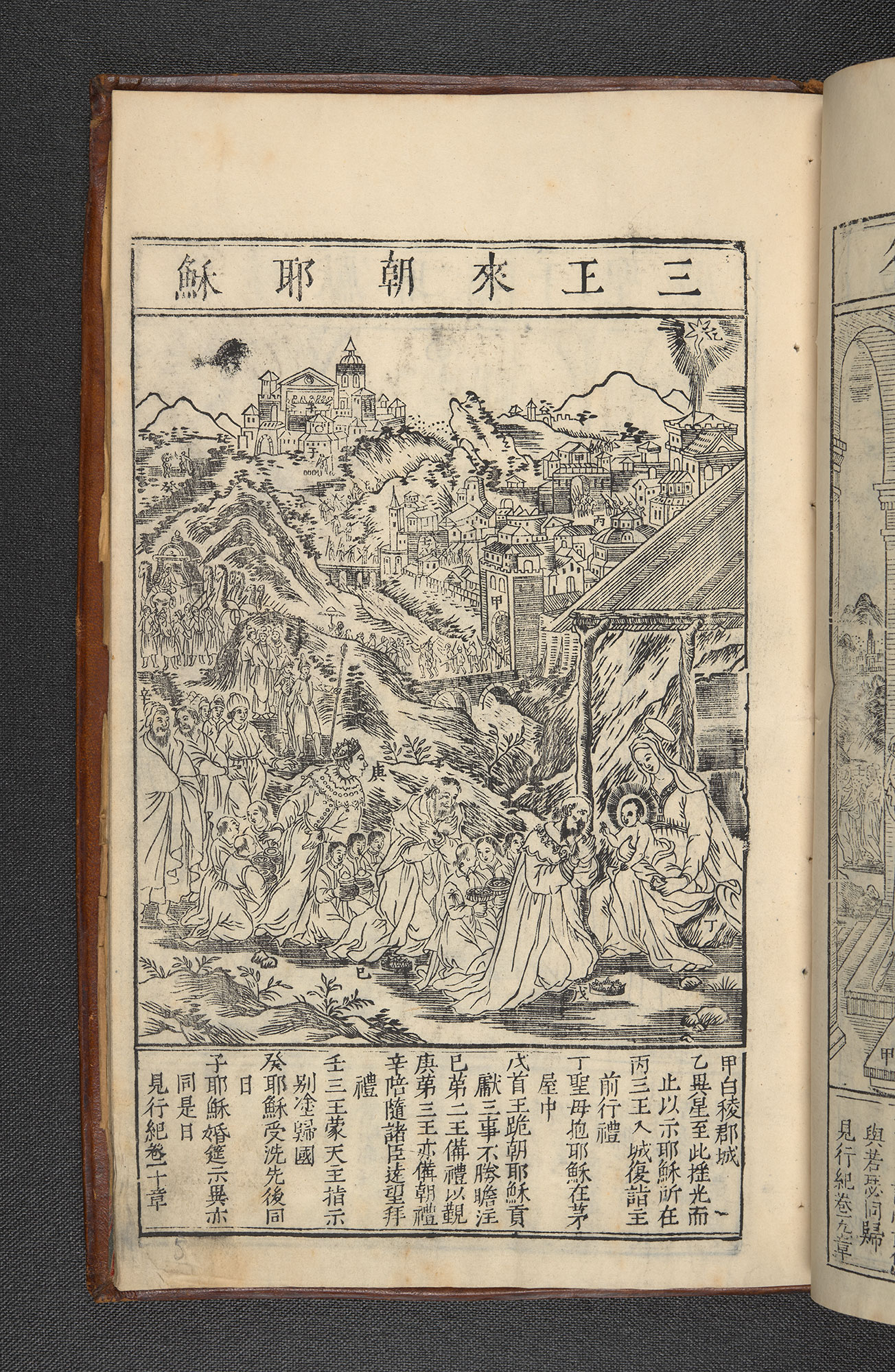
Aleni's 1637 illustrated life of Jesus.

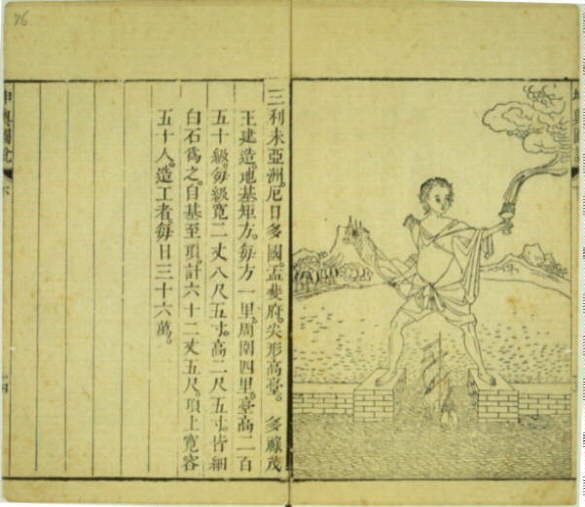
A depiction of the Colossus of Rhodes in a 1620 book by Aleni.

Giulio Aleni (Latin: Julius Alenius; 1582 – 10 June 1649), in Chinese Ai Rulüe, was an Italian Jesuit missionary and scholar. He was born in Leno near Brescia in Italy, at the time part of the Republic of Venice, and died at Yanping in China. He became a member of the Society of Jesus in 1600 and distinguished himself in his knowledge of mathematics and theology. He is known for helping publish the Zhifang Waiji, an atlas in Chinese. Giulio Aleni also wrote a treatise criticizing the Ming dynasty, the Ming emperors and their elites, and their mistakes and errors. Near the end of his life, the Ming dynasty eventually got destroyed and replaced by the Qing dynasty founded by the House of Aisin-Gioro.

== Life ==
In 1610, he was sent as a missionary to China. While waiting at Macau for a favorable opportunity to enter the country, he taught mathematics to local scholars and published his "Observation sur l'éclipse de lune du 8 Novembre 1612, faite a Macao" (Mémoires de l'Acad. des Sciences, VII, 706).

He adopted the dress and manners of the country, was the first Christian missionary in Jiangxi, and built several churches in Fujian. One of his converts, Li Jiubiao, recorded the responses of Aleni and Andrius Rudamina, one of his fellow Jesuits, to the questions and speculations of his parishioners and compiled them into a journal.

== Works ==
He published works in Chinese on a variety of topics. His cosmography, Wanwu Zhenyuan (萬物真原; The True Origin of the Ten-thousand Things), was translated into Manchu during the reign of the Kangxi Emperor (Wanwu Zhenyuan translated in Manchu script: ᡨᡠᠮᡝᠨ
ᠵᠠᡴᠠᡳ
ᡠᠨᡝᠩᡴᡳ
ᠰᡝᡴᡳᠶᡝᠨ Wylie: Tumen chakai unengki sekiyen, Möllendorff: Tumen jakai unengki sekiyen). A copy was sent from Beijing to Paris in 1789. He completed the work of earlier Jesuit scholars to produce the Zhifang waiji, a global atlas written in Chinese and one of the first to include the Americas.

Among his most important religious works are a controversial treatise on the Catholic Faith, in which are refuted what he saw as the principal errors of the Ming dynasty; and The Life of God, the Saviour, from the Four Gospels (Peking, 1635–1637, 8 vols.; often reprinted, e.g. in 1887 in 3 vols) and used even by Protestant missionaries.

== Legacy ==
The life and works of Giulio Aleni are the subject of several conferences in 1994 and 2010. Two of his books, Life of Matteo Ricci, Xitai of the West and Holy images of the Heavenly Lord have been presented to the public by Fondazione Civiltà Bresciana in two separate occasions, on 13 and 25 October 2010.
