= Nihil obstat =

Latin declaration of no objection

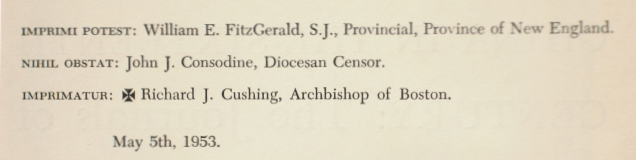
An imprimi potest, a nihil obstat and an imprimatur (by Richard Cushing) on a book published by Random House in 1953. The book in question is the English translation by Louis J. Gallagher of De Christiana expeditione apud Sinas by Matteo Ricci and Nicolas Trigault.

Nihil obstat (Latin for 'nothing hinders' or 'nothing stands in the way') is a phrase traditionally used by Catholic Church authorities to formally declare that there is no objection to the publication of a book. It also has other uses.

== Publishing ==
The phrase nihil obstat is used by a Catholic cleric known as a Censor Librorum (Latin for 'censor of books') to indicate that a book contains nothing contrary to Catholic doctrines, faith, or morals. Canon law requires this approval for the publication of books by faithful Catholics if they "touch upon matters of faith and morals", and requires that pastors enforce this rule. The Censor Librorum is delegated by a bishop to review the text in question over approximately two months. If an author is a member of a religious institute, such as a monastery, and the book concerns religion or morals, then canon law further requires the imprimi potest ('it can be printed') of the major superior before publication. Finally, the bishop of the author's diocese or of the place of publication gives the final approval, the imprimatur ('let it be printed').

== Other uses ==
In the context of canonizations, the phrase is used as an order from the Vatican that "nothing hinders" an investigation of a possible saint's life. Once this order is given, a diocesan or eparchial tribunal can be formed to investigate the life of the candidate, furthering the process of possible canonization.

The phrase can also be used by the Vatican in relation to the limited approval of miraculous events, stating that it has no objection to public devotion of these events. One such order was given for Our Lady of Medjugorje in 2024.

== See also ==
- Imprimi permittitur
- Index Librorum Prohibitorum
