= Pietro Tacchi Venturi =

Jesuit priest and historian

Pietro Tacchi Venturi (Italian pronunciation: [ˈpjɛːtro ˈtakki venˈtuːri]; 18 March 1861–19 March 1956) was considered an antisemitic Jesuit priest and historian who served as the unofficial liaison between Benito Mussolini, the Fascist leader of Italy from 1922 to 1943, and Popes Pius XI and Pius XII. He was also one of the architects of the 1929 Lateran Treaty, which ended the "Roman Question" (a dispute over the status of the papacy since the Italian unification), and recognized the sovereignty of Vatican City, which made it an actor of international relations. A claimed attempt to assassinate Venturi with a paper knife (speculated to be actually the result of a homosexual lovers' quarrel {{Citation needed}}), one year before the treaty's completion, made headlines around the world. Venturi had begun the process of reconciliation by convincing Mussolini to donate the valuable library of the Palazzo Chigi to the Vatican.

According to Susan Zuccotti, Venturi "had an uncanny ability to gain access where more official papal diplomats could not" and thus was utilized for some of the most important papal priorities. Venturi had no official rank in the church to match his extraordinary influence, and was known in Vatican circles as the "man in black".

== Early life (1861-1922) ==
Venturi was born in San Severino Marche. He became a member of the Society of Jesus, a religious order within the Catholic Church, in 1878. He established a reputation as a scholar of history and literature. Venturi was admitted into the Pontifical Academy of Archaeology and other scientific bodies. Venturi was the official historian of the Italian branch of the Jesuit order and the Secretary of the Society of Jesus from 1914 to 1921.

His magnum opus was a history of the Jesuits. Another important work by Venturi was the publication of previously unpublished writings of Matteo Ricci, one of the founders of the Jesuit China missions. The Opere storiche del P. Matteo Ricci, S.J (Historical Works of Father Matteo Ricci, S.J.) appeared in two volumes in 1911 and 1913, and included Ricci's letters as well as his Commentarj della Cina (Commentary on China), the Italian manuscript that had been previously published only in the expanded and edited Latin version of Nicolas Trigault (as De Christiana expeditione apud Sinas). However, Venturi's lack of knowledge of Chinese made it necessary for Fr. Pasquale d'Elia to produce another, better annotated edition of Ricci's manuscripts (known as Fonti Ricciane) some 30 years later, in the 1940s.

== Pius XI's liaison to Mussolini (1922-1939) ==
=== Chigi library donation (1922) ===
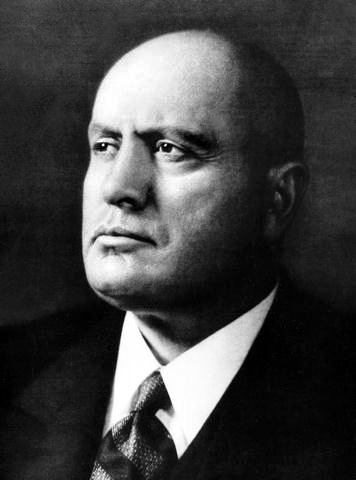
Picture of Benito Mussolini. Venturi was the Confessor to Mussolini, whom he befriended before his rise to power.

Benito Mussolini "liked and trusted" Venturi, whom he had known since 1922, during the Fascist struggle for power. The friendship between the two predated Mussolini's rise to power. He thus became the "normal instrument for messages between the pope and Mussolini". Venturi's relationship with Mussolini became professional when Pope Pius XI chose him to negotiate the purchase of the ancient library of the Palazzo Chigi (the residence of the prominent Chigi family) from the newly created Fascist regime (the Italian government was on the verge of buying the collection). Venturi persuaded Mussolini to donate an ancient state collection of religious books to the Vatican free of charge. Vatican attempts to buy the texts date back to Pope Benedict XV, who lacked the requisite funds to complete the transaction.

Mussolini's donation became the start of the process of reconciliation between the Italian government and the papacy, which had been at odds since the Papal States were seized during the Italian unification. Along with Count Galeazzo Ciano, Mussolini's son-in-law, Venturi served as the unofficial, yet authoritative "intermediary between Palazzo Venezia and the Vatican". Venturi was also the personal Confessor of Mussolini and an adviser to the Duce on religious matters generally. His political views could generally be classified as a strain of Clerico-Fascism. Venturi was an anti-Semitic conspiracy theorist who believed the Catholic Church was threatened by a "worldwide Jewish-Masonic plutocracy" and advocated putting all Italian Jewish bankers under police surveillance. In September 1926, Venturi gave Mussolini a pamphlet entitled Zionism and Catholicism accusing the Jews of wanting "to destroy current society and dominate the world themselves, as their Talmud proscribes".

=== Lateran Treaties (1927-1929) ===
Venturi was a negotiator of the Lateran Treaty (1929), which ended the "Roman Question" (a dispute over the status of the papacy since the Italian unification) and officially recognized the sovereignty of Vatican City, which led the Church State to become an actor in international relations (apart from the Holy See itself, as it had previously been) according to international law. In May 1928, already internationally known for his role as a negotiator, Venturi survived an attempted assassination by "Signor De Angelis" with a paper knife, receiving only a neck laceration when he ducked out the way. Two years later, another priest similar to Venturi in appearance was killed. Venturi claimed to have been the victim of an international conspiracy organized by an anti-Fascist group based in Paris led by Gaetano Salvemini, but the police were highly doubtful of his story. It was established during the police investigation that Venturi was a homosexual who had "illicit relations" with young men he picked up on the streets of Rome and took back to his apartment for sex, and the murder attempt was just a lovers' quarrel.

The New York Times described Venturi as the "chief negotiator, who remains in the dark and is almost unknown". Noting Pius XI and Mussolini's penchant for privacy regarding the negotiations, the Times continued to describe Venturi as "a quiet man who could tell much" yet refused to acknowledge that he was any more than "Mussolini's personal messenger to the Vatican". Nominally, Francesco Pacelli (the brother of Eugenio Pacelli, future Pope Pius XII) became the chief negotiator and Venturi his intermediary with Mussolini during the final stages of the negotiation (after the death of State Councilor Domenico Barone). The other negotiators were Francesco Borgongini Duca, the Vatican's Secretary of Extraordinary Affairs, and Professor Gianinni Barone, the brother of Domenico; however, Venturi himself was the originator of the negotiations.

Venturi received the Order of Saints Maurice and Lazarus from the Italian monarchy in 1932 for his role in negotiating the treaty. Francesco Borgongini Duca, the nuncio to Italy from 1929 to 1953, supplemented Venturi as the official liaison between Pius XII and Mussolini, but Venturi retained his influence.

=== Mussolini novel (1929) ===
At the urging of Venturi, Mussolini wrote a second book – Una Conversione – about his conversion to Catholicism, meant as a sequel to his twenty-year-old novel which was extremely critical of the church: Claudia Particella: l'amante del Cardinale (translated and published in English as The Cardinal's Mistress). Venturi himself wrote the preface to Una Conversione.

=== Catholic Action (1931) ===
In 1931, Venturi negotiated the end to a dispute between Pius XI and Mussolini regarding, Azione Cattolica, the Italian branch of Catholic Action, a lay Catholic community organization group. Venturi was granted an unheard of hour-long audience with the pontiff during his summer vacation, and then an additional meeting with Cardinal Secretary of State Pacelli. The Vatican claimed that Venturi was merely "preparing the ground for official negotiation". Don Luigi Sturzo, the founder of the Partito Popolare Italiano, a Catholic political party in Italy, credits Venturi with ending the dispute.

Mussolini allowed the 15,000 youth organizations to reopen, but they were required to affiliate closely with the official Fascist youth organization, Opera Nazionale Balilla. The terms of the agreement were meant to give the Vatican a role in "Fascist Youth Education" and required that the Catholic organization be devolved to the diocesan level, with no centralized hierarchy, and that chaplains be attached to the Balilla chapters. Venturi himself sat in on the final meeting between Mussolini and the pope.

=== Drafting of the Anti-Jewish laws (1938) ===
Venturi was kept informed by Mussolini during the drafting of Italy's anti-Jewish laws (which deprived Jews of various civil, political, and economic rights), expressing concerns about the effect of the laws on Catholics, both through mixed marriages and Catholic converts from Judaism. Specifically, Venturi sought the lifting of the ban on marriages between "Aryans" and "non-Aryans".

== Role under Pius XII (1939-1956) ==
Upon the election of Pius XII by the papal conclave, 1939, it was announced that Dom Francesco Tomasetti (d. 5 May 1953), the procurator general of the Salesian Order, would replace Venturi as the unofficial messenger between the pope and Mussolini after "a struggle of another kind, less open but having many of the same elements as that over the choice of Secretary of State". Venturi remained the official representative to various Italian government agencies such as the heads of police and general board of demographics and race.

On the eve of World War II, Cardinal Luigi Maglione, the Vatican Secretary of State, used Venturi as his emissary with Mussolini. Venturi persuaded Mussolini to give his approval to Pius XII's plan to mediate between the Five Powers (the Axis powers of Germany and Italy and the Allies of the United Kingdom, France, and Poland). Through Venturi, who continued to be "very important" to Pius XII because of his weight with Mussolini, Pius XII communicated to the Italian government his disapproval of the French and British attempts to negotiate an alliance with Soviet Russia, the so-called "peace front". The Vatican did not have diplomatic relations with the Soviet Union. Pius XII also sent Venturi to Brussels for mediation negotiations with regard to the Danzig crisis in the summer of 1939 in an attempt to avert World War II. Venturi was a key player in the negotiations, though they accomplished nothing.

The plan that Mussolini presented to Venturi to end the Danzig crisis called for Poland to allow the Free City of Danzig to rejoin Germany in exchange for negotiations with Germany about allowing the Poles to use Danzig without customs duties. The plan also called for German-Polish negotiations on the returning the Polish Corridor to Germany and on the status of the German minority in Poland and Polish minority in Germany. Despite the opposition of Cardinal Domenico Tardini who complained the peace plan favored Germany at the expense of Poland, Venturi persuaded both Cardinal Maglione and Pius to accept it as the last, best chance to stop another world war. On 31 August 1939, Monsignor Filippo Cortesi, the Papal Nuncio in Warsaw, presented Mussolini's peace plan to Jan Szembek, appealing to him as a Catholic to accept this solution to the Danzig crisis that had been endorsed by the Pope, but the Polish government rejected it under the grounds that this plan lopsidedly favored Germany.

=== The Ustashe regime ===
On a few occasions, Venturi used this influence to spare Catholic converts from Judaism from the Holocaust. The fascistic Ustashe regime that ruled Croatia between 1941 and 1945 had a policy of exterminating some of the Serb, Jewish and Romany minorities while forcing others to convert to Catholicism. Michael Phayer documents one such occasion where Venturi intervened on behalf of Croatian converts. Venturi is otherwise little mentioned in Phayer's book, referred to simply as a "Jesuit rescuer".

=== Opposition to repeal of Anti-Jewish laws (1943) ===
In August 1943, when Marshall Pietro Badoglio, Mussolini's successor, was contemplating a complete rescission of Italy's anti-Jewish laws, Venturi met with the Secretary of the Interior and requested that only the portions affecting Jewish converts to Catholicism be repealed. In doing so, Venturi was advancing the position of Pius XII, as he later reported to Cardinal Secretary of State Luigi Maglione. Venturi assured Maglione:

I took care not to call for the total abrogation of a law which, according to the principles and traditions of the Catholic Church, certainly has some clauses that should be abolished, but which clearly contains others that have merit and should be confirmed.

=== The Roman razzia (1943) ===
After the Roman razzia (the deportation of Roman Jews to death camps as part of The Holocaust), Venturi recommended to the Vatican Secretariat a "symbolic and therefore sham inquiry into the fate of the Jews of Rome". He reasoned, "a step like this by the Holy See, even if it does not obtain the desired effect, will without doubt help increase the veneration and gratitude toward the August Person of the Holy Father".

== Death ==
Nothing else is known of the role of Venturi after the death of Mussolini on 28 April 1945, or for that matter after Mussolini's fall from power. Venturi died "virtually forgotten" on 18 March 1956, at the age of 95.
