= Imprimi potest =

Catholic authorization for publication

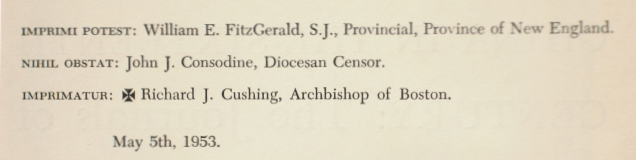
An imprimi potest, a nihil obstat and an imprimatur (by Richard Cushing) on a book published by Random House in 1953. The book in question is the English translation by Louis J. Gallagher, S.J. of De Christiana expeditione apud Sinas by Matteo Ricci, S.J. and Nicolas Trigault, S.J.

Imprimi potest or imprimi permittitur (Latin for 'it can be printed') is a declaration by a major superior of a religious institute of the Catholic Church that writings on questions of religion or morals by a member of the institute may be printed. Superiors make such declarations only after censors charged with examining the writings have granted the nihil obstat, a declaration of no objection. Final approval can then be given through the imprimatur ('let it be printed') of the author's bishop or of the bishop of the place of publication.

== See also ==
- Index Librorum Prohibitorum
