= Imprimatur =

Declaration authorizing publication of a book

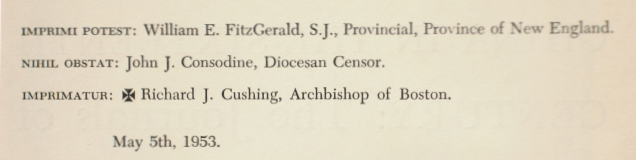
An imprimi potest, a nihil obstat, and an imprimatur (by the Archbishop of Boston) on a book published by Random House in 1953. The book in question is the English translation by Louis J. Gallagher of De Christiana expeditione apud Sinas by Matteo Ricci. and Nicolas Trigault.

An imprimatur (sometimes abbreviated as impr., from Latin, "let it be printed") is a declaration authorizing publication of a book. The term is also applied loosely to any mark of approval or endorsement. The imprimatur rule in the Catholic Church effectively dates from the dawn of printing, and is first seen in the printing and publishing centres of Germany and Venice; many secular states or cities began to require registration or approval of published works around the same time, and in some countries such restrictions still continue, though the collapse of the Soviet bloc has reduced their number.

== Catholic Church ==
In the Catholic Church an imprimatur is an official declaration by a Church authority that a book or other printed work may be published; it is usually only applied for and granted to books on religious topics from a Catholic perspective. Approval is given in accordance with canons 822 to 832 of the Code of Canon Law, which do not require the use of the word "imprimatur".

The grant of imprimatur is normally preceded by a favourable declaration (known as a nihil obstat) by a person who has the knowledge, orthodoxy, and prudence necessary for passing a judgement about the absence from the publication of anything that would "harm correct faith or good morals." In canon law such a person is known as a censor or sometimes as a censor librorum (Latin for "censor of books"). The episcopal conference may draw up a list of persons who can suitably act as censors or can set up a commission that can be consulted, but each ordinary may make his own choice of person to act as censor.

An imprimatur is not an endorsement by the bishop of the contents of a book, not even of the religious opinions expressed in it, being merely a declaration about what is not in the book. In the published work, the imprimatur is sometimes accompanied by a declaration of the following tenor:

The nihil obstat and imprimatur are declarations that a book or pamphlet is free of doctrinal or moral error. No implication is contained therein that those who have granted the nihil obstat or imprimatur agree with the contents, opinions or statements expressed.

The person empowered to issue the imprimatur is the local ordinary of the author or of the place of publication. If he refuses to grant an imprimatur for a work that has received a favourable nihil obstat from the censor, he must inform the author of the reasons for doing so. This gives the author the opportunity to make changes so as to overcome the ordinary's difficulty in granting approval.

If further examination shows that a work is not free of doctrinal or moral error, the imprimatur granted for its publication can be withdrawn. This happened three times in the 1980s, when the Holy See judged that complaints made to it about religion textbooks for schools were well founded and ordered the bishop to revoke his approval.

The imprimatur granted for a publication is not valid for later editions of the same work or for translations into another language. For these, new imprimaturs are required.

The permission of the local ordinary is required for the publication of prayer books, catechisms, and other catechetical texts and for school textbooks on Scripture, theology, canon law, church history, or religious or moral subjects. It is recommended, but without obligation, that books on the last-mentioned subjects not intended to be used as school textbooks and all books dealing especially with religious or moral subjects be submitted to the local ordinary for judgement.

A Catholic Imprimatur is often accompanied by a Maltese Cross ✠ before the name of the Bishop.

In 2011, Bishop Kevin C. Rhoades was the first bishop to grant an imprimatur to an iPhone application.

== English law ==
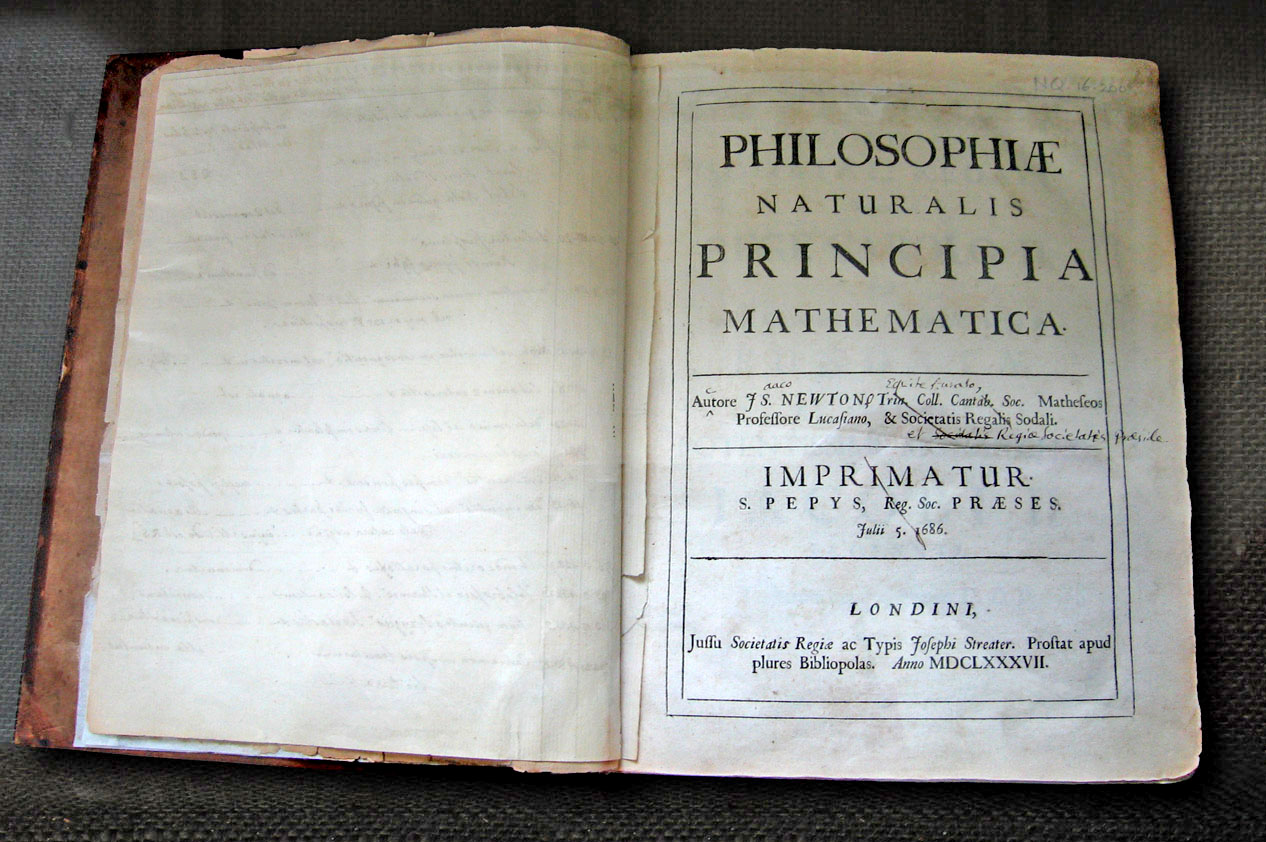
Newton's Principia, bearing the imprimatur of Samuel Pepys, then-President of the Royal Society

English laws of 1586, 1637, and 1662 required an official licence for printing books. The Licensing of the Press Act 1662 (14 Cha. 2. c. 33) required books, according to their subject, to receive the authorization, known as the imprimatur, of the Lord Chancellor, the Earl Marshall, a principal secretary of state, the Archbishop of Canterbury, or the Bishop of London. This law finally expired in 1695.

== Other senses ==
In commercial printing the term is used, in line with the meaning of the Latin word, for final approval by a customer or his agent, perhaps after review of a test printing, for carrying out the printing job.

As a metaphor, the word "imprimatur" is used loosely of any form of approval or endorsement, especially by an official body or a person of importance, as in the newspaper headline, "Protection of sources now has courts' imprimatur", but also much more vaguely, and probably incorrectly, as in "Children, the final imprimatur to family life, are being borrowed, adopted, created by artificial insemination."

== Judaism ==
Haskama (approval, הַסְכָּמָה) is a rabbinic approval of a religious book concerning Judaism. It is written by a prominent rabbi in his own name, not in the name of a religious organization or hierarchy.

It is often in the form of a letter, possibly on stationery, and generally includes not only "approbation, recommendation, or endorsement" of the work, but also a blessing for the success of the author in this and other accomplishments. As a result, at times a Haskama given to the author is printed, verbatim, in later works from the same author.

An additional value for haskama letters, long ago, was to serve as a form of copyright, to protect the author or the printer from any unauthorized reproduction.

== Similar terms ==
- Digital imprimatur is a hypothetical system of Internet censorship.
- In painting, the distinct term "imprimatura" is use of an underlying coat of paint.

== See also ==
- Imprimi permittitur
- Prior restraint
