= Three Pillars of Chinese Catholicism =

Group of Chinese converts to Christianity

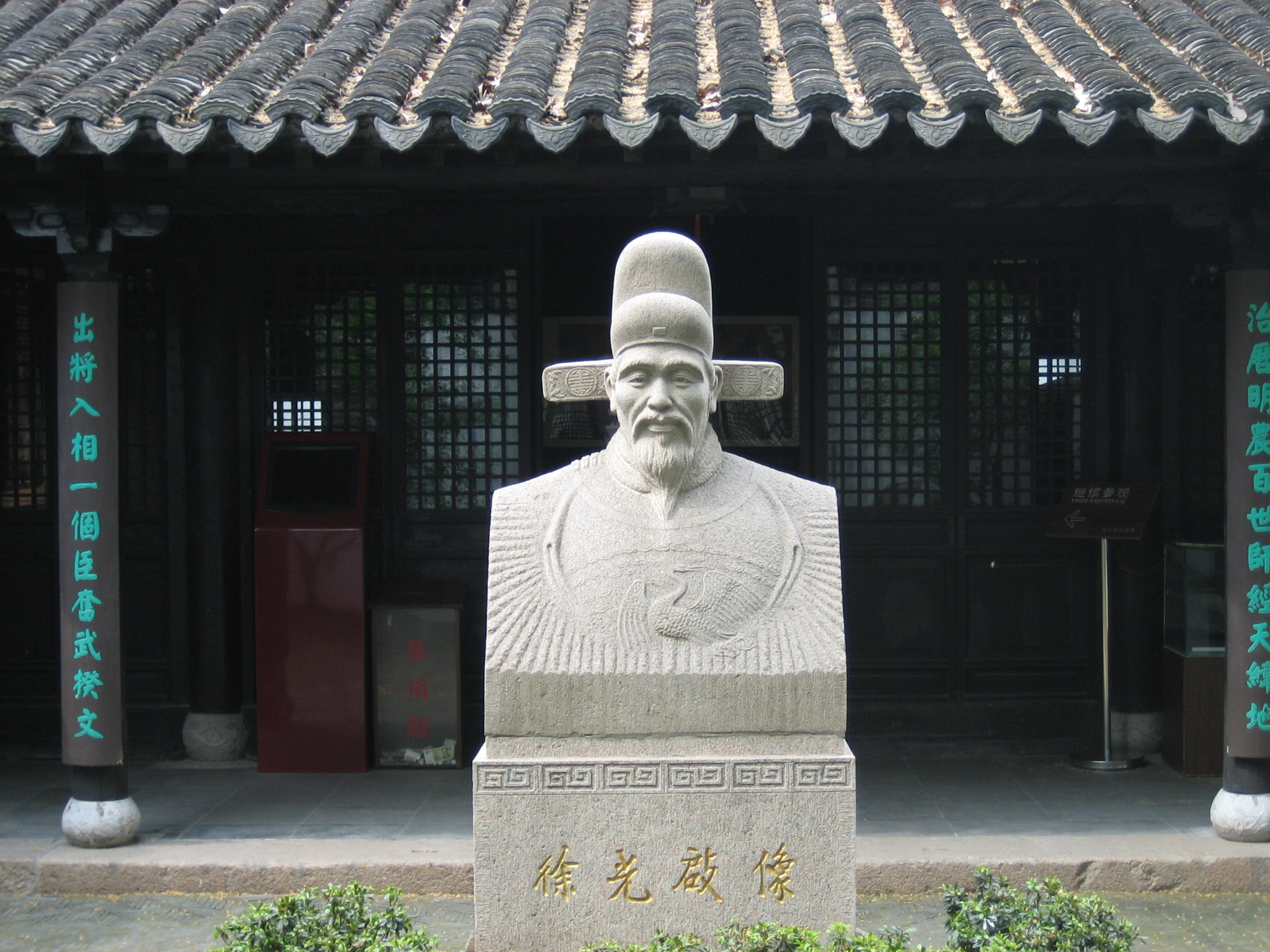
Bust of Xú Guāngqǐ.

The Three Pillars of Chinese Catholicism (聖教三柱石, literally the "Holy Religion's Three Pillar-Stones") refer to three Chinese converts to Christianity, during the 16th and 17th century Jesuit China missions:

- Xú Guāngqǐ (Wade–Giles: Hsü Kuang-ch'i; 徐光啟, 1562–1633) of Shanghai
- Lǐ Zhīzǎo (Wade–Giles: Li Chih-tsao; 李之藻, 1565–November 1, 1630) of Hangzhou
- Yáng Tíngyún (Wade–Giles: Yang T'ing-yün; 楊廷筠, 1557–1627) of Hangzhou

Their combined efforts helped lead Hangzhou and Shanghai to become centres of missionary activity in late Ming China. These men shared an interest in Western science and mathematics, and it is probable that this was what first attracted them to the Jesuits responsible for their conversion.

== Origin of name ==
This name is derived from a passage in Saint Paul’s letter to the Galatians (2:9):

“And when they had known the grace that was given to me, James and Cephas and John, who seemed to be pillars, gave to me and Barnabas the right hands of fellowship…"

The passage in Chinese is somewhat more obvious:

「那稱為教會柱石的雅各、磯法、約翰，就向我和巴拿巴用右手行相交之禮...」

wherein it calls James, Peter and John the "pillars of the Church". The inevitable connection was then seen between the "pillars" of the early Church and the three men who helped to evangelize Ming China.

== Xu Guangqi ==
Xu Guangqi was a Chinese scholar-bureaucrat, Catholic convert, agricultural scientist, astronomer, and mathematician. He holds the title of Servant of God, and received his beatification in April 2011. He contributed to the translation of the first parts of Euclid's Elements into Chinese. He also worked on the reform of the Chinese calendar, which constituted the first major collaboration between scientists from Europe and from the Far East, though it was completed after his death.

== Yang Tingyun ==
Yang Tingyun was born into a devout Buddhist family. At the age of 35 (1592), after taking the Imperial Examinations he became an Inspector in the imperial ministries. In 1600 he met Matteo Ricci, one of the founding fathers of missionary activity in China, but did not convert or receive Baptism at that time. He worked with Ricci and other Jesuits to publish China's first global atlas, the Zhifang waiji. Later however, in 1611, Yang accompanied a fellow official back to Hangzhou to arrange for his late father's funeral, and saw that he had not only thrown out his home's Buddhist statues and imagery, but that he did not send for Buddhist priests to give the man his last rites. Instead, he had brought two Jesuit priests, Lazzaro Cattaneo and Nicolas Trigault, to do the job and a Chinese monk Zhōng Míngrén (鍾鳴仁) to explain the rite's significance to the gathered friends and relatives. One month later, Yang gave up his concubine and was himself baptized, receiving the Christian name "Michael" (Mí'é'ěr 彌額爾).

Of particular significance is Yang Tingyun's willingness to abandon status symbols such as his family's traditional beliefs and the concubine, for these were some of the main obstacles in the way of the Jesuit mission to China. Several Chinese were impressed by Yang's conversion and followed his example, starting with the 30 members of his family and then moving on to his friends, in total convincing over 100 people to accept Christ. His other notable contributions to Christianity in China include his funding of the missionaries in Hangzhou, granting them the use of his estate as their base of operations; using his influence and wealth to offer protection and shelter to Christian refugees during periods of anti-Christian unrest; and also the buying up of land at Tianshui Bridge (天水橋) and Dafangjing (大方井) to build the first church in Hangzhou and the Jesuit Cemetery.

When the church had for the most part been completed, Yang became severely ill. Knowing it was his end, Yang Tingyun requested the sacraments from the priest, and in January 1628, at the age of 71, died. Because he had been seen as a great scholar and man of excellent moral fibre, the people of Hangzhou had him honoured in the Xiāngxián Cí (鄕賢祠), a hall for honouring local heroes and ancestors.

=== Writings ===
- Light Emitted by Heaven, Tiān shì míng biàn 《天釋明辨》, is a treatise on the union of Confucianist and Christian thought. He writes,

A spiritual nature is God's gift to man, and it is the greatest gift of all, ... benevolence, righteousness, social etiquette, and wisdom [the four Confucianist virtues] are all indeed of this nature. These things that God has given us are what we've had all along. The Bible calls it morality and Confucius calls it conscience.

- Answers to Questions (Dài yí biān 《代疑編》), and Answers to Questions Continued (Dài yí xù biān 《代疑續編》), are attempts to resolve Chinese people's apprehensions about Christianity.
- The Owl and the Phoenix do not Sing Together, 1616 – a defense of Christianity against the accusations in Confucian heterodoxy, attacking the White Lotus teachings.
- Yang Tingyun also helped to translate prayers, scripture, and the writings of foreign missionaries into Chinese.

== Li Zhizao ==
Li Zhizao was a Hangzhou official who held various posts around China, the most notable of which were in Nanjing and what is now called Puyang County in Henan Province. He was known by the courtesy names of Wǒcún (我存) and Zhènzhī (振之), as well as by the pseudonym "The Man of Liangyan" (涼庵居士, alternative writings: 涼庵逸民, 涼庵子, or 涼叟).

In 1610, while in Beijing, Li became gravely ill and, without any friends or family in Beijing to care for him, was soon on the verge of death. At that point in his life he became acquainted with the Jesuit Matteo Ricci who brought him back to health. Ricci also during this time taught him much of Western science, mathematics, and Catholicism. Shortly thereafter Li Zhizao was baptized and given the Christian name "Leon" (liáng 良).

After converting, Li Zhizao took an oath saying, "As long as I live, all that God has given me, I shall put to good use for Him." While still in Beijing, he presented Matteo Ricci with 100 taels of gold for the purpose of building a church there. Later Li would also be responsible for introducing Catholicism to his hometown of Hangzhou. The year after he returned home for his father's funeral, he brought with him two other Jesuit missionaries. In 1625 he was the first to publish the Chinese text of the Nestorian Stele.

=== Writings ===
Li Zhizao was responsible for translating the following Western science and mathematics into Chinese.

- Plea to Translate Books on Western Calendar Methods (Qǐng yì xī yáng lì fǎ děng shū shū 《請譯西洋曆法等書疏》), was submitted to the Ming dynasty Wanli Emperor to hire missionaries and edit the Chinese calendar.

== See also ==
- Roman Catholicism in China
