= Lazzaro Cattaneo =

Italian Jesuit missionary

Lazzaro Cattaneo (Sarzana, Italy, 1560 - Hangzhou, China, 19 January 1640), (Chinese: 郭居静; pinyin: Guō Jūjìng; Sidney Lau: Gwok^{3} Gui^{1} Jing^{6}) was an Italian Jesuit missionary who invented the first tone markings for Chinese transcription.

== Early life ==
Cattaneo was born into a noble family at Sarzana, near Genoa, Italy. In 1581, he entered the Collegio di S Andrea of the Society of Jesus in Rome. He moved to Portugal in 1585, where he completed his training and was ordained in 1587. He sailed for the Portuguese colony of Goa, in India, on 1 April 1588, and, by 1589, became superior of the mission at Fishery Coast.

== Chinese mission ==
Cattaneo joined Matteo Ricci in Shaoguan (formerly Shaozhou), Guangdong, in 1594, after first having spent a year in Macao. He had originally been headed for Japan, but was redirected to Macao by the Society of Jesus' Visitor in the Indies, Alessandro Valignano. He accompanied Ricci on his first trip to Peking, arriving on 7 September 1598 in hopes of establishing a mission there, but failed to gain an imperial audience and left two months later. He returned to Nanking, where he stayed until falling ill and leaving for Macao in 1603. He travelled to Malacca in 1604.

Having returned to Macao, word spread, in 1606, that Cattaneo was plotting to lead a Portuguese invasion and install himself as Emperor of China, resulting in the enslavement of the population. The rumour was sparked by a belief that a large fortification was under construction in Macao, a belief arising from the secretive method and large number of Japanese labourers employed in the construction of St Paul's Cathedral. After a short period of intense conflict in which at least one Portuguese Jesuit, Francisco Martinez, died in imprisonment, accused of spying for Cattaneo, the rumour was dispelled when Cattaneo hosted a Chinese military investigator on a tour of St Paul's College where only books and humble students were to be seen.

Cattaneo was in Nanchang in 1606, then established the mission in Shanghai, living there from 1608 to 1610, and finally settling in Hangzhou in 1622 where in 1628 he was to become Nicolas Trigault's confessor.

== Chinese orthography ==
On arrival in Macao, Cattaneo attended the Society of Jesus-operated school, established in 1572 and whose first principal had been Antonio Vaz, for Chinese studies. He was probably studying there when it was incorporated into the famed centre of Chinese studies, St Paul's College, in 1594. He continued Chinese studies in Shaozhou.

In 1598-99, Cattaneo collaborated with Ricci and Sebastian Fernandes on Ricci's second Chinese dictionary in a Western language. Ricci's first such dictionary had given no indication at all of the tones essential to meaning in Mandarin and it was Cattaneo who invented the system of five tone markings in this dictionary, now lost, known as Vocabulario sinico-europeo.

== Works ==
- Ricci, Matteo; Cattaneo, Lazzaro; Fernandes, Sebastian (1599). Vocabulario sinico-europeo. Nanking, China.
- Ling-hsing i-chu (Introduction of the soul to God)
- Hui-tsui yao-chi (On contrition and sorrow for sin)
- Shenhou pien
- Memoria (1606)

== Death ==
Cattaneo died in Hangzhou, China, on 19 January 1640, after a long period of paralysis, at the age of 79.

== Legacy ==
Though the dictionary containing his invention was ultimately lost, Cattaneo's tonal system was used in one of the earliest Romanisation systems, that of Nicolas Trigault, in 1626, and adopted in 1656 by Martino Martini in his, the earliest surviving, Western grammar of Chinese. It appeared again in Michal Boym's 1667 translation of Kircher's China Illustrata, and it was Cattaneo's work that formed the basis for Étienne Fourmont's 1737 work, Linguae Sinarum mandarinicae hieroglyphicae grammatical duplex patine et cum characteribus Sinensium.

Cattaneo was a capable musician and taught Diego de Pantoja clavichord in Nanjing. Pantoja, on orders of Emperor Wanli, subsequently passed on this skill to four eunuchs who were the first members of the imperial court to learn Western music.

The Via Lazzaro Cattaneo, Dragona, Vitinia, near Rome, is named for him.
