= Cathedral of the Immaculate Conception (Hangzhou) =

- 圣母无染原罪大教堂
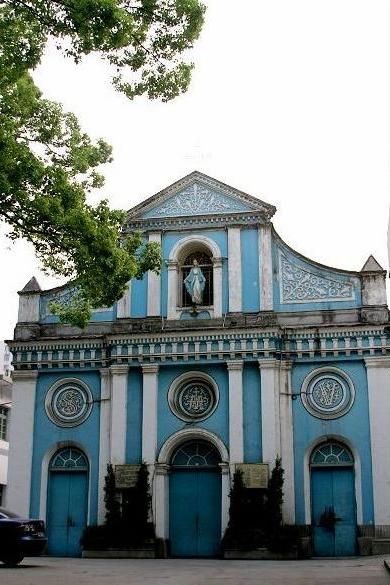
- Cathedral of the Immaculate Conception
- 30°16′11″N 120°09′45″E
- Location: Cathedral of the Immaculate Conception, N. Zhongshan Rd, 仓桥社区, 310003 Zhejiang, China
- Country: China
- Denomination: Roman Catholic

History
- Status: Cathedral
- Founded: 1661; 365 years ago
- Founder: Martino Martini
- Dedication: Our Lady of the Immaculate Conception

Architecture
- Functional status: Active
- Architect: Romanesque architecture

Administration
- Archdiocese: Roman Catholic Archdiocese of Hangzhou

The Cathedral of Our Lady of the Immaculate Conception (Chinese: 圣母无原罪主教座堂; pinyin: Shèngmǔ wúyuánzuì zhǔjiàojǐtáng) is a Roman Catholic cathedral, located at 415 Zhongshan Road North (中山北路415号) not far from Wulin Square (武林广场) in downtown Hangzhou, China. Since it is the only Catholic church in service within the city of Hangzhou itself, it is also known simply as Tiānzhǔ Táng (天主堂) or "the Catholic church".

== History ==
=== Beginnings ===
Li Zhizao (李之藻) was a Ming dynasty official-scholar and Catholic from Hangzhou working in Beijing, who had been converted and baptized by Matteo Ricci. In 1611, when he received news of his father's death, he hurried back to Hangzhou and on the way brought with him two Jesuit priests from Nanjing, Lazaro Cattaneo and Nicolas Trigault. They took care of Li Zhizao's father's funeral and on May the 8th at the Li family's residence held the first Mass ever in Hangzhou. One of the new converts in Hangzhou was a wealthy Imperial Inspector named Yang Tingyun (杨廷筠). He and his entire family were originally Buddhist, but upon his conversion he went so far as to turn his home's Buddhist altar into a chapel. Together, Li Zhizao, Yang Tingyun and Xu Guangqi (of Shanghai) are known as the "Three Pillars of Chinese Catholicism" (三大柱石). Later in 1616, during a period of persecution against Christians in Nanjing, many refugees fled to Hangzhou where they were at first housed in the homes of Li Zhizao and Yang Tingyun. It was soon realized that a better solution would be required, and in 1627 Yang Tingyun bought a piece of land near Wulin Gate (武林门) on Guan Road (观巷) and had Hangzhou's first church built there, slightly west of where today's church lies. It was soon followed the next year by another church constructed near Qiantang Gate (钱塘门, once one of the 10 gates in the old city walls of Hangzhou, located at the intersection of today's Hubin 湖滨 and Qingchun 庆春 roads). None of these two churches or the gates and city walls they once stood by remain today however.

=== The Cathedral ===
The current cathedral in Hangzhou, dedicated to Our Lady of the Immaculate Conception, was originally built in 1661 by the Italian Jesuit Martino Martini, and is still one of the oldest churches in China. Its original Romanesque form was designed with three naves, and two rows of columns separating them. The two side altars venerated statues of St. Peter and St. Paul while the central altar was for the worship of Christ. At the time of its completion it had been lavishly decorated and was said by many to be the most beautiful church in China. Of note were also the large frescoes painted all over the church, that as the Jesuit Charles Le Gobien notes in his "Histoire de l'édit de l'empereur de la Chine", were based on standard Western imagery (the conversion of St. Paul, the conversion of the emperor Constantine, etc.), but were painted by Chinese artists in the Chinese brush style.

In 1691, during the reign of the Kangxi Emperor in the Qing dynasty, the governor of Zhejiang, Zhāng Pénghé (张鹏翮) banned Catholicism, took control of the cathedral and ordered all books contained within to be burned. The following year, under pressure from the Italian Jesuit Prosper Intorcetta, the emperor lifted the ban and ordered the Hangzhou cathedral to be fully restored. Nevertheless, the church was severely damaged later that same year in a fire and remained unrepaired for many years until 1699, when the Kangxi Emperor himself, who was on a tour of southern China, passed by the church. He ordered one of his ministers to go in and inspect the place, after which he decided to grant the church 200 silver taels to complete the repairs. He also had the two characters "敕建" (chìjiàn, "built by order of the emperor") inscribed upon the church gate.

In 1730, the Yongzheng Emperor again forbade the practice of Catholicism, and the church edifice was subsequently converted into a Taoist temple by the name of Tiānhòu Gōng (天后宫, Temple of the Celestial Empress), but only after the emperor had chiseled his father Kangxi's "敕建" inscription off the gateway. Later, in 1848, it came into the possession of a group of English, Dutch, and French Lazarists, whereupon it resumed operations as a Catholic church.

During the Cultural Revolution the cathedral was put to other uses for a period of about 12 years. The main church hall was divided into 10 or more smaller cells for imprisoning criminals. The other church buildings were also divided up as residences. Finally in 1982 the cathedral reopened, and on December 12 of that year, Mass was once again celebrated. By 1986 all the families that had moved in during the Cultural Revolution were relocated off of the property. The cathedral is now protected as a Municipal Historic Site.

== Mass ==
Chinese masses are held every Sunday morning. 7:00am, 9:00am and 7:00pm. A large congregation attend and can overflow into the car park for the 8:30am service. There is an English mass held on Saturday evenings at 6:30pm. The church has two choirs which practice regularly, and also holds Bible studies and classes for catechumens.

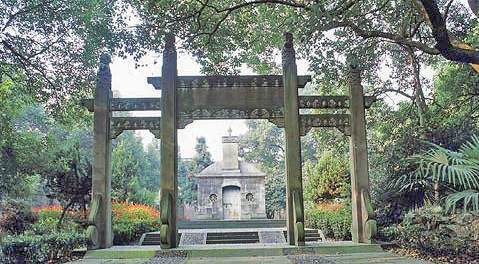
Gateway preceding the tomb of Martino Martini

== Tomb of Martino Martini ==
Hangzhou is also home to the gravesite of Martino Martini. After the cathedral had just barely been completed, the renowned cartographer, historian, and missionary died suddenly of cholera in June 1661, and was buried in the Dafangjing Jesuit Cemetery (大方井卫匡国等公墓) on the north side of Beigao Feng (北高峰). His remains were found to be undecayed as late as 20 years after his death, as attested by both Belgian Jesuit Philippe Couplet and Prosper Intorcetta, and they therefore became the object of great veneration. During the Cultural Revolution the site was completely destroyed, but was fully restored in 1985, although by that time it was no longer known which bones exactly had belonged to Martino Martini. The cemetery is now protected as a Provincial Historic Site.

The rectangular memorial crypt faces west and is preceded by a Chinese style "spirit way" (神道) walkway and "pailou" (牌楼) gateway on which is inscribed in Chinese the line from the Apostles' Creed, "I believe in the resurrection of the body" (我信肉身之复活). It is located right next to the Xihu Beer Factory (西湖啤酒厂) on Xixi Road (西溪路) and can be entered by request.

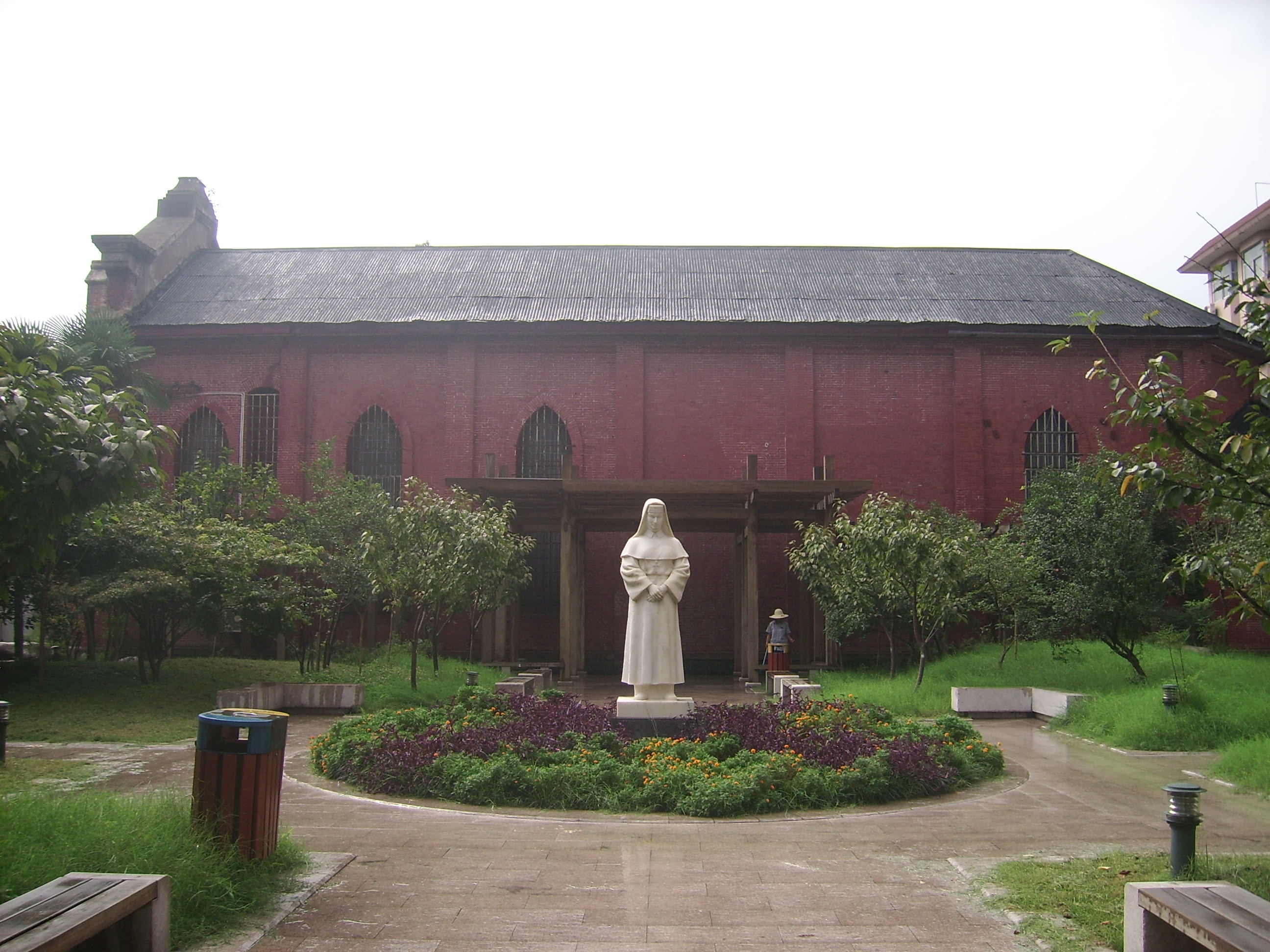
Statue of Sr. Hacard near the chapel of her Sisters of Charity Hospital

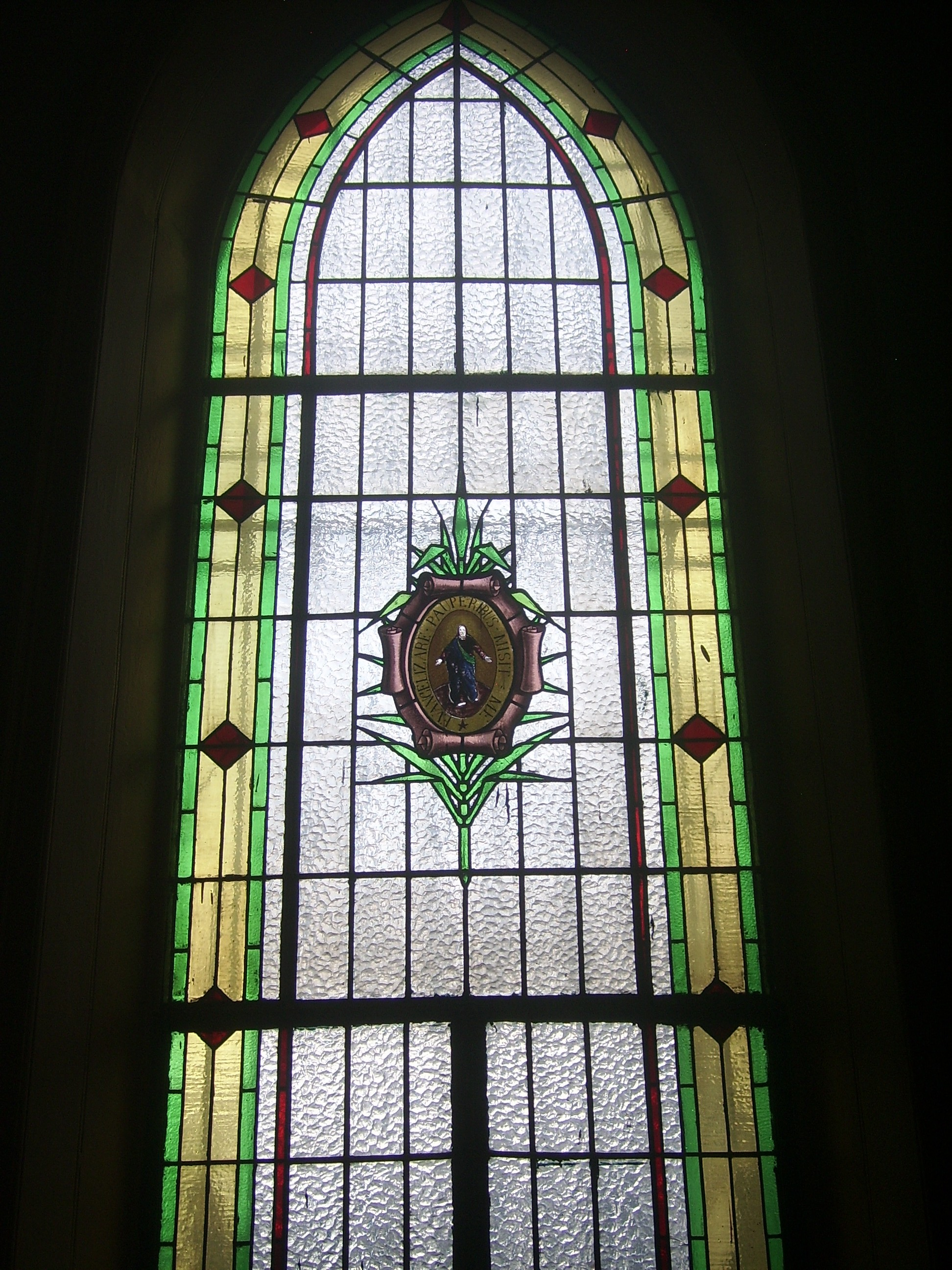
Stained-glass from the hospital chapel. The Latin inscription is a reference to Luke 4 and reads: EVANGELIZARE PAUPERIBUS MISIT ME, meaning "He sent me to preach the Gospel to the poor".

== Sisters of Charity Hospital ==
In the 1920s Hangzhou was also the object of some French missionary activity when a nun named Sister Hacard from the Sisters of Charity began to build a hospital compound on Hangzhou's Daomao Road (刀茅巷). It was founded in 1922 and gradually added to until 1928. The site also included a Gothic-style chapel which, with the one exception of a Marian statue it once contained, survived the Cultural Revolution remarkably intact, stained-glass windows and all. Sr. Hacard's hospital is now part of the Hangzhou City Red Cross Hospital that can be found enclosed by Daomao Road, Fengqi Road (凤起路), and East Huancheng Road (环城东路). While the hospital buildings are still in use as such, the chapel has not been used for religious purposes since before the Cultural Revolution and instead is now used by the hospital as a hall for giving presentations. A statue of Sr. Hacard has since been erected in the middle of a nearby garden and the chapel, being the only Gothic structure in all of Hangzhou, is today protected as a Provincial Historic Site.

== Convent of the Sacred Heart ==
The Catholic Church in Hangzhou also includes a nuns' convent dedicated to the Sacred Heart located in an old historic building on the slopes of Mt. Wu not far from Wushan Square (吴山广场).

== See also ==
- Roman Catholic Marian churches
- Hangzhou
- Roman Catholic Archdiocese of Hangzhou
- Martino Martini
- Three Pillars of Chinese Catholicism
- Roman Catholicism in China
- Jesuit China missions
- List of Roman Catholic missionaries in China
- List of Catholic cathedrals in China
- List of Roman Catholic Dioceses in China
- Religion in China
- Christianity in China
- List of Jesuit sites
