= Anti-Jewish laws =

State legislation that discriminates against Jews

Anti-Jewish laws have been a common occurrence throughout the history of antisemitism and Jewish history. Examples of such laws include special Jewish quotas, Jewish taxes and Jewish "disabilities".

During the 1930s and early 1940s, some laws were adopted in Nazi Germany and Fascist Italy. During World War II, they were exported to European Axis powers and puppet states. Such legislation generally defined Jews, deprived them of a variety of civil, political, and economic rights, and laid the groundwork for expropriation, deportation, and ultimately, they laid the groundwork for the Holocaust.

== Early history ==
=== 19th century ===
- May Laws: Temporary regulations regarding the Jews (also known as May Laws) were proposed by the minister of internal affairs Nikolay Pavlovich Ignatyev and enacted on 15 May (3 May O.S.), 1882, by Tsar Alexander III of Russia.

== 20th century ==
=== Nazi Germany ===
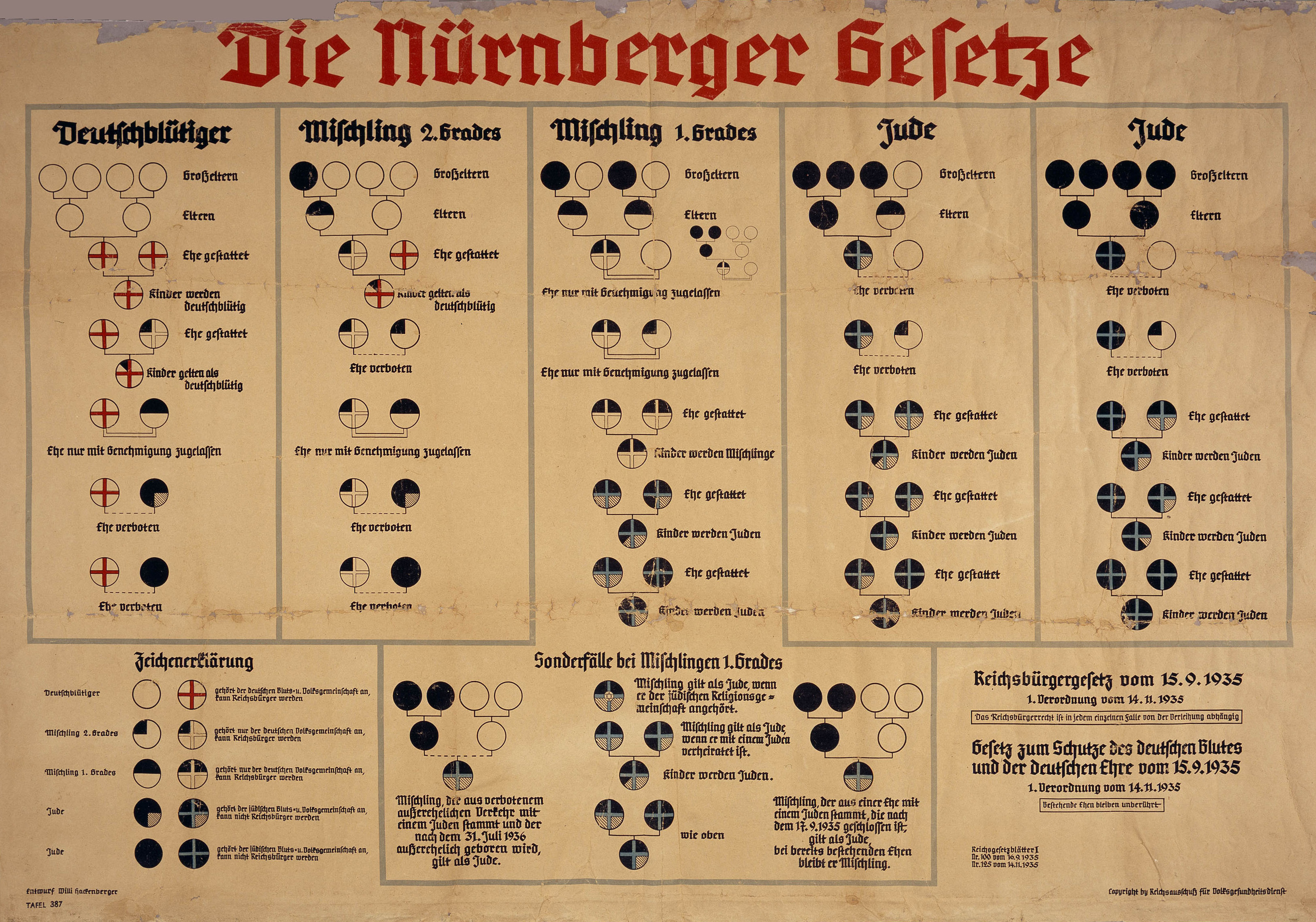
1935 chart used to explain the Nuremberg Laws

The 1933 Law for the Restoration of the Professional Civil Service excluded all "non-Aryans", including those who had even just one Jewish grandparent (in contrast to the way the Nuremberg Laws of 1935 regarded such people, as "quarter-Jews ("Vierteljuden")) from the civil service. In 1935, the Nazis passed the Nuremberg Laws which forbid Jews from citizenship and prohibited sexual relations and marriages between Jews and "Aryans". The total number of laws against Jews reached 400 since the end of the war. The issuing of laws begun in 1933, with 80 until the Nuremberg Laws, and the other decrees were issued against the Jews after the Nuremberg Laws.

=== Fascist Italy ===
The Manifesto of Race published on July 14, 1938, prepared for the enactment of racial laws to be introduced. The Italian Racial Laws were passed on November 18, 1938, excluding Jews from the civil service, the armed forces, and the National Fascist Party, and restricting Jewish ownership of certain companies and property; intermarriage was also prohibited. The legislation remained in effect after the fall of Mussolini during the first months of the Badoglio government, before they were repealed on January 20, 1944.

=== Poland ===
The Second Polish Republic, from the 1920s the Polish government excluded Jews from receiving government bank credits, public sector employment, and obtaining business licenses. From the 1930s, limits were placed on Jewish enrollment in university education, Jewish shops, Jewish export firms, Shechita, Jewish admission to the medical and legal professions, Jews in business associations, etc. While in 1921–22, 25% of students were Jews, by 1938–39 the proportion went down to 8%. The far-right National Democracy (Endeks) organized anti-Jewish boycotts. Following the death of Poland's ruler Józef Piłsudski in 1935, the Endeks intensified their efforts which led to violence and in a few cases pogroms in smaller towns. In 1937, the Endeks passed resolutions that "its main aim and duty must be to remove the Jews from all spheres of social, economic, and cultural life in Poland". The government in response organized the Camp of National Unity (OZON), which in 1938 took control of the Polish parliament. The Polish parliament then drafted anti-Jewish legislation similar to anti-Jewish laws in Germany, Hungary, and Romania. OZON advocated mass emigration of Jews from Poland, boycott of Jews, numerus clausus (see also Ghetto benches), and other limitation on Jewish rights. According to William W. Hagen, by 1939, prior to the war, Polish Jews were threatened with conditions similar to those in Nazi Germany.

=== Slovak State ===
The Slovak State passed its first racial legislation on April 18, 1939, defining Jews as including religious Jews, and any Jews baptized after October 30, 1918. According to Morley, "the Jewish Code (Judenkodex) was promulgated on September 9, 1941, without the approval of the Slovak parliament or the signature of Tiso". The Slovak parliament on May 15, 1942, retroactively legalized the deportations, deprivation of Jewish citizenship, and expropriation of property that had occurred.

=== Hungary ===
Hungary passed laws on 28 May 1938 and 5 May 1939 banning Jews (defined primarily by official religion; e.g. practising Judaism) from various professions. A third law, added in August 1941, defined Jews practically as anyone with at least two Jewish grandparents - exempted those who were born Christian and their parents had been as well the time of their marriage, etc. - and forbade sexual relations or marriages between Jews and non-Jews.

=== Romania ===
In August 1940, the Romanian government passed legislation that Jews who converted to Christianity would be regarded as Jews for legal purposes, and barred from marriage with ethnic Christians; by defining Jews not based on religion this was "the first step, and a large one at that, to further racial legislation".

=== Vichy France ===
France passed its Law on the status of Jews in October 1940. Similar legislation was adopted later that year in the French possessions of Algeria, Morocco, and Tunisia.

=== Bulgaria ===
Bulgaria passed its anti-Jewish code, the Law for protection of the nation, in 1941.

=== Independent State of Croatia ===
The Independent State of Croatia issued a definition of Jews on April 30, 1941, laying the groundwork for expropriation and forced labor, followed by deportations.

=== Empire of Japan ===
Imperial Japan never issued legislation specifically targeting Jews. However, they were still subject to Japanese persecution in some countries occupied by the Imperial Japanese Armed Forces, such as Indonesia and Singapore.
