= Conversion of Jews to Catholicism during the Holocaust =

The conversion of Jews to Catholicism during the Holocaust is one of the most controversial aspects of the record of Pope Pius XII during The Holocaust.

According to John Morley, who wrote about Vatican diplomacy during the Holocaust, "one of the principal concerns of the Vatican, especially in the early days of the war, was those Jews who had converted to Catholicism, the so-called Catholic or Christian non-Aryans". Morley further argues that Pius XII was "primarily, almost exclusively, concerned about baptized Jews". Moreover, Pius XII's purported fear of reprisals against "non-Aryan Catholics" is often cited as a motive for his not speaking out against the Holocaust.

In many Axis and Axis-occupied countries, racial legislation restricted, banned, or did not recognize the conversion of Jews to Christianity. Across Europe—in Croatia, France, Germany, Hungary, Italy, Romania, and Slovakia—Pius XII's nuncios saved their staunchest protests for the effects of the various anti-Jewish laws on baptized Jews. According to Roth and Ritner, "this is a key point because, in debates about Pius XII, his defenders regularly point to denunciations of racism and defense of Jewish converts as evidence of opposition to antisemitism of all sorts". The Holocaust is one of the most acute examples of the "recurrent and acutely painful issue in the Catholic-Jewish dialogue", namely "Christian efforts to convert Jews".

== Brazilian Visa Project (1939-1941) ==
In March 1939, various members of the German Catholic hierarchy asked the newly elected Pius XII to petition the Brazilian government for 3,000 immigration visas for German Catholic Jews to settle in Brazil. This was followed by two years of diplomatic exchanges, starting with an instruction form Cardinal Secretary of State Luigi Maglione to Benedetto Aloisi Masella, the nuncio in Rio de Janeiro to request the visas from President Getúlio Vargas. The visas were formally conceded by Vargas, through Brazil's Conselho de Imigração e Colonização (CIC), on June 20, 1939.

From the very beginning, the visas came with strict conditions, "some necessary, others obstructionist", which grew stricter over time. The visas were available to baptized Jews in Germany and other countries, but were required to submit a recommendation from the nunciature of their respective country. The emigrants were further required to prove that their baptism had occurred before 1933. Protestant Jews were denied visas. Later conditions included a substantial monetary transfer to the Banco do Brasil and approval by the Brazilian Propaganda Office in Berlin.

In the face of these many hurdles, Cardinal Theodor Innitzer of Vienna wrote to Pius XII on February 4, 1941, asking for his immediate aid in granting the visas, in light of the beginning of deportation of the 60,000 Jews of Vienna, at least 11,000 of whom had been baptized. A reply from Maglione outlined the various difficulties associated with such a step. Innitzer was not satisfied, and complained again later that month.

The visa program was suspended on September 3, 1940, and officially ended on November 20, 1941. The Spanish and Portuguese governments had already refused to issue travel visas for those using the immigration visas to Brazil. Innitzer updated the Vatican again on the increased pace of the deportations on May 20, 1942, and the Vatican tried for the last time to appeal to the Brazilians in July 1942. Maglione wrote in December 1941 to the bishop whose request had initiated the project that: "as you have certainly been informed [...] many emigrants have departed and—I regret to say—from what I have been told, a good many of them, both by their improper conduct and alleged demands, have not corresponded to the concern which the Holy See has shown in their behalf". The emphasis of Maglione's letter was not on the failure of a diplomatic effort, but chagrin at the alleged conduct and lack of gratitude of the recipients of the visas. According to the Encyclopedia of the Holocaust, by "improper conduct", Maglione could only have meant that the recipients continued to practice Judaism.

It is difficult to verify the exact number of visas issued. Only 1,000 visas were actually allocated to the Brazilian embassy in the Vatican, and most—although not all—were probably used. The remaining 2,000 in control of the Brazilian officials in Germany were never used, not even in the early months of the project. Maglione was "remarkably acquiescent" to the cancellation of the program and his response to the Brazilian ambassador about the possibility of reinstating the program in the future was "agonizingly impersonal and diplomatic".

Morley views the importance of the Brazilian visa project as fourfold: first, in demonstrating the concern of Pius XII "primarily, almost exclusively" with baptized rather than unconverted Jews, and viewing their persecution primarily as an infringement on the rights of the church; second, in exemplifying the reliance on diplomacy, even as "an end in itself"; and third, in showing the reluctance of the pope to disturb the status quo, "even when a staunchly Catholic country reneged on its promise to the Pope"; and finally, the use of prior failure as an "apologia" against later proposals to aid Jews.

== Action on behalf of converts by country ==
According to Holocaust historian Michael Marrus, "while the Church often came to the defense of persecuted converted Jews, or 'non-Aryan Catholics' as they were sometimes called, seeing state action against them as a violation of agreements that assigned to the Church the right to determine who was and who was not a Catholic, the Church was much less solicitous of Jews who remained Jewish".

=== In Croatia ===
Similarly, in 1943 Cardinal Maglione instructed Aloysius Stepinac, the primate of Croatia, to save "as many Jews—mostly converts—as possible during an upcoming Nazi roundup". According to Morley, "there is an underriding current in all of Marcone's efforts that appears to limit his interests and activities to those Jews who had been baptized Catholic or were married to Catholics would not be harmed".

=== In France ===
One of the main protests of nuncio Valerio Valeri against the Vichy racial legislation was that there was no provision for conversion to Christianity written into the law. Morley notes that the effect on converts was the sole basis for Vatican protests: "any governmental attitude that did not recognize the rights of the Church was a source of complaint by the Vatican. There is no basis for suggesting that any of the other provisions gave occasion for complaint".

According to Morley,

Valeri had no particular competence to comment on the laws or treatment accorded to Jews, unless they were baptized Catholics. Moreover, there was no concordat between France and the Vatican spelling out the duties and rights of each. Unlike Romania, for example, there were no large-scale conversions of Jews. Thus, there was no potential source of conflict with the government over the rights of baptized Jews, or legal justification for such Vatican intervention.

=== In Germany ===
The Vatican's objections to the Nuremberg Laws of 1935 were limited to their effects on converts from Judaism, particularly with respect to their right to marry "Aryan" Catholics. According to Morley, "as would be expected and was paralleled elsewhere, Orsenigo's early communications with Maglione concerning Jews dealt with those who had been baptized Catholic". Orsenigo indicated interest in (unrealized) plans to send emigrate baptized Jews, particularly to a colony in Ethiopia. Other documents testify to Orsenigo's efforts to emigrate baptized Jews, but there is no evidence as to the outcome of these efforts.

=== In Hungary ===
Angelo Rotta, Pius XII's nuncio to Hungary, regarded as Righteous among the Nations, telegraphed Cardinal Secretary of State Maglione to inform him of his actions to save Jews, particularly those who had converted to Catholicism. Nuncio Rotta handed out letters of protection to many Jews during the Holocaust, although the majority of them went to converts to Catholicism. The Hungarian Catholic Church throughout the 1930s and 1940s supported efforts to purge Jewish influence, "with the exception of some weak protests against the inclusion of Jewish converts in the increasingly severe anti-Jewish measures". According to Roth and Ritner, "apart from converts to Christianity, Cardinal and Primate of Hungary Justinian Seredi had no interest in the fate of the Jews".

=== In Italy ===
The Vatican's protest against the Italian racial legislation was that "there was no recognition of the rights of baptized Jews, whom the Vatican considered Catholics". The protests of the racial laws were the "primary focus" of the Vatican's activity related to Jews. According to Morley, "there is no evidence that the officials of the Secretariat of State were concerned about the restrictions placed upon the Jews. Their ongoing complaint was that the laws did not recognize the changed status of Jews who converted to Catholicism".

Of the refugees housed in the Vatican itself during the Roman razzia, often cited by defenders of Pius XII, most were non-Jews or converts. Among the non-Christian refugees saved by the Vatican was Israel Zolli, the chief rabbi in Rome at the time. In 1945, Zolli converted to Catholicism and chose to be christened "Eugenio Maria" in homage to Pope Pius XII, who was born Eugenio Maria Giuseppe Giovanni Pacelli.

=== In Romania ===
Nuncio to Bucharest Andrea Cassulo's "early efforts on behalf of Jews concerned almost exclusively those who had been baptized Catholic". He passed on to the Vatican in 1939, but did not pursue, a project to emigrate the 150,000 converted Jews of Romania to Spain. From 1940 to 1941, his primary diplomatic responsibility was to protest various pieces of legislation insofar as they infringed on the rights of baptized Jews, particularly with respect to intermarriage and attendance of baptized Jews to Catholic schools, which were protected by the Romanian concordat.

Cassulo made three protests to Ion Antonescu: on November 20, 1940, December 2, 1940, and February 14, 1941. Five days after the last protest, Antonescu informed the nuncio of his signing a decree allowing students of any ethnic origin to attend their own religious schools.

However, "much more worrisome to the Vatican" was a March 18, 1941, decree forbidding the conversion of Jews to Christianity, with severe penalties for Jews attempting to convert and cooperating priests. Again, Cassulo protested that this violated the concordat, but the Romanian government replied that the decree did not because it would only affect the "civil status" of baptized Jews. Bypassing the "blatant racism" of this reply, Maglione's "sole interest" was that the rights of the concordat be extended to baptized Jews. The Vatican considered the matter settled after a July 21, 1941, note from the minister of foreign affairs granted the enumerated demands of Maglione: "free profession of the Catholic faith, admission to Catholic schools, religious instruction, and spiritual assistance in various areas of society".

The Romanian racial laws prompted an unprecedented interest in conversion to Catholicism by Romania's Jews, causing the Vatican to issue a directive to priests directing them to be "diligent in their judgement of prospective converts". Their profession was not to be automatically accepted, but rather a "six-month period of their instruction and preparation, their conduct, interest, and desire to reform their lives according to Catholic principles were to be observed. If after all this, there were any doubts about their motivation, this baptism was to be postponed".

It became obvious to Cassulo that the motivations of converts were not solely religious, and he wrote to Rome: "it is clear that human motives cannot be denied, but it is likewise true that Providence also uses human means to arrive at salvation". Nationwide statistics on Jewish baptisms are unclear, but they certainly rose to the level that the government became concerned. In Bessarabia, 20% of the Jewish population, 40,000 Jews, were baptized in the hope of escaping deportation. At the request of the Romanian minister, Daniel Papp, stricter instructions were sent to Cassulo, recommending further discretion in baptizing Jews.

In July 1942, the archdiocese of Bucharest refused to hand over the baptismal registers to the Ministry of Religion, although it did allow them to have a list of names of those baptized. By December 1943 the Vatican believed that it had resolved most issues with the Romanian government over the rights of converted Jews. According to Morley, although Cassulo was "possibly the most active of the Vatican diplomats in matters concerning the Jews", his protests were limited to violations of the concordat, and thus to the rights of converted Jews. Morley judges him sincere in his belief that it was "God's plan" that the Holocaust increase the number of converts. Overall, Cassulo was "reluctant to intervene, except for the baptized Jews". Morley argues that "his Jewish contemporaries might have exaggerated, in those years of crisis, his influence and efforts on their behalf" based on the difference between Jewish sources and the ADSS (Cassulo is recognized as Righteous among the Nations).

=== In Slovakia ===
The new Slovak government under President Tiso, a Catholic priest, passed anti-Jewish legislation on April 18, 1939, defining any converts baptized after October 30, 1918, as Jews. As in Romania, "of particular concern to the Vatican diplomat" were the provisions pertaining to Catholic schools. A lesser concern was any future matrimonial legislation. Chargé d'affaires Burzio attempted to find an organization, particularly in America, that could aid in the emigration of Jewish Catholics, lest they share in the fate of deportation. A letter from the Slovak bishops about the impending deportations "specifically limited their concern to Catholic Jews and asked that they not be deported". The letter assured the Slovak government these Jews had been sincere in their conversion and had made a "complete break with their Jewish background".

Morley notes that

as in other countries, the original Slovak racial laws were protested by the Vatican, not because of any deleterious effects upon the Jews, but because they infringed on the rights of the Church. Whenever racial regulations did not exempt baptized Jews from the liabilities imposed upon Jews, Maglione and his representatives felt justified in issuing protests.

In particular, restrictions rights to attend Catholic schools and intermarry were viewed primarily as restrictions on the rights of the church. Maglione's letter of protest "did not deal with, nor did it intend to, the injustices committed against the Jews. Maglione made it very clear that he was defending the rights of Catholics 'of Jewish origin'".

== Notable examples ==
Israel Zolli, the Chief Rabbi of Rome, converted to Catholicism after the war and took the baptismal name "Eugenio" in honor of Pius XII. However, Zolli remains a controversial figure in the Jewish community for his actions during the war.

== Return of orphans to their relatives after the war ==
Following the pattern established in the Mortara case from the 1850s, the Vatican resisted attempts to return Jewish orphans to their relatives for over a decade after the war, especially if they had been baptized.

In 2005, Corriere della Sera published a document dated 20 November 1946 on the subject of Jewish children baptized in war-time France. The document ordered that baptized children, if orphaned, should be kept in Catholic custody and stated that the decision "has been approved by the Holy Father". Nuncio Angelo Roncalli (who became Pope John XXIII, and was recognized by Yad Vashem as Righteous Among the Nations) ignored this directive. Abe Foxman, the national director of the Anti-Defamation League (ADL), who had himself been baptized as a child and had undergone a custody battle afterwards, called for an immediate freeze on Pius's beatification process until the relevant Vatican Secret Archives and baptismal records were opened. Two Italian scholars, Matteo Luigi Napolitano and Andrea Tornielli, confirmed that the memorandum was genuine but asserted that the reporting by the Corriere della Sera was misleading, as the document had originated in the French Catholic Church archives rather than the Vatican archives and strictly concerned itself with children without living blood relatives that were supposed to be handed over to Jewish organisations.

In 2020, after researchers were given access to the previously-sealed archives from the pontificate of Pius XII, the policies documented by the Corriere della Sera were confirmed for the famous case of the Finaly Affair, in which the Vatican secretly directed clerics in France to defy court orders to turn over the children to an aunt after the war.

== Alleged appropriation of the Holocaust ==
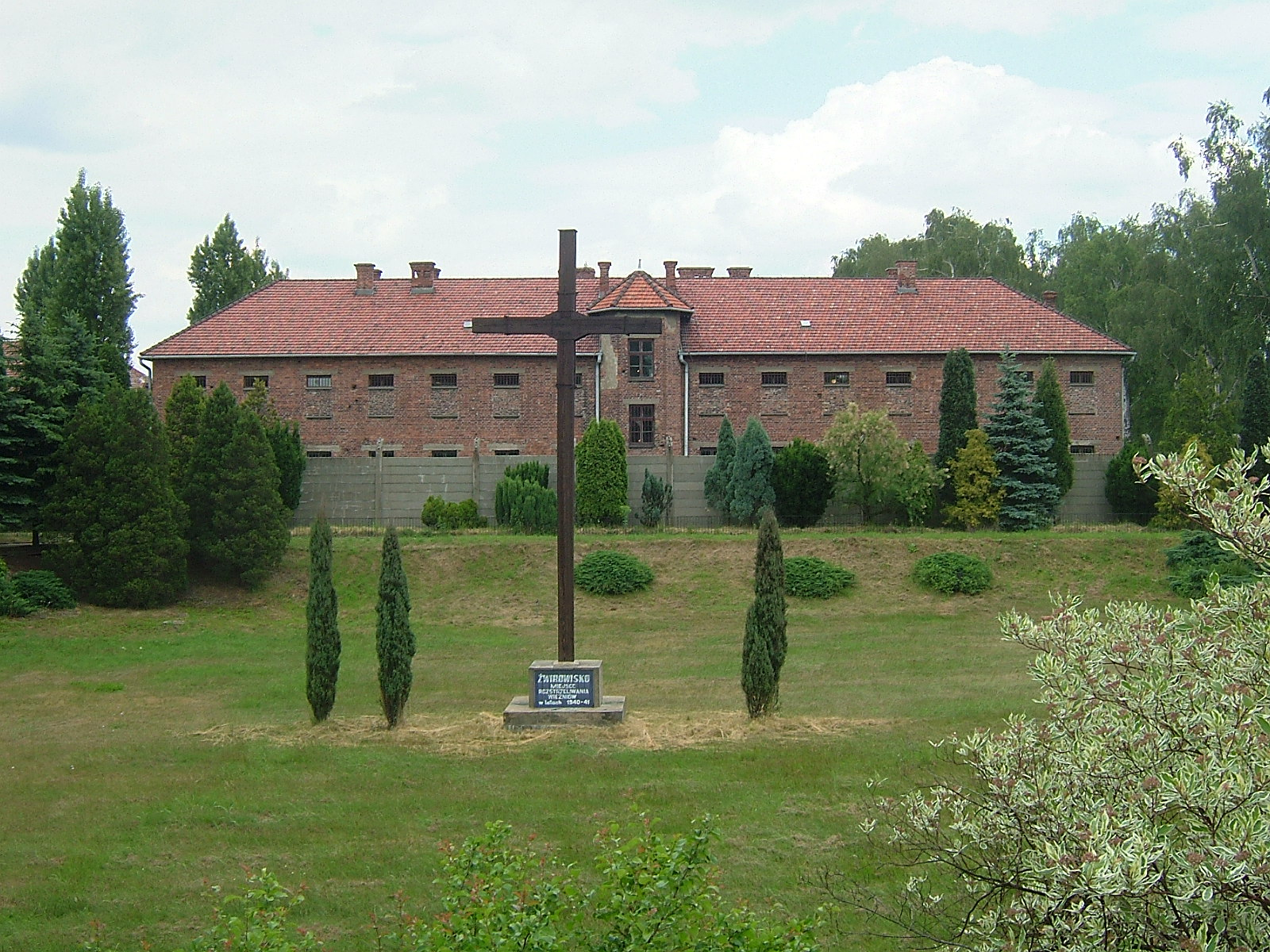
The Auschwitz cross

Edith Stein's (a German nun who converted from Judaism in 1922 and was killed in Auschwitz) status as a martyr has been somewhat controversial due to the question of whether she was killed for her faith or ethnicity. Many Jews view the claim of conferring of martyrdom on Stein as an act of appropriation of the Holocaust, holding that Stein was targeted by the Nazis for her Jewish ethnicity, not for her conversion to Catholicism. This concern of "appropriation" is not unique, with similar criticisms having been raised about Catholic narratives regarding other convert victims of the Holocaust—"making it seem that the Church, not the Jewish people, was the primary victim of Nazi genocide".

The conflict over the Auschwitz cross near Auschwitz I typifies these controversies, as Auschwitz is also the site of the martyrdom (according to the Catholic Church) of saints such as Maximilian Kolbe. According to Daniel Goldhagen's A Moral Reckoning: "the Church's attempt, at least in part, to Christianize the Holocaust, to incorporate the Holocaust into its own teaching, takes several forms: the invention of false Christian martyrs, false Christian heros [sic], and false Christian victims, and the appropriation of Jewish suffering as its own". Goldhagen continues:

In 1998 the Church canonized Edith Stein, a convert to Christianity. The Germans killed her not because she was a Catholic or a nun, which they deemed irrelevant, but because she had been born a Jew. So the Church has sent her on the path to sainthood on the false pretext that she was a Holocaust martyr to her Christian faith. In 1982, the Church canonized Father Maximilian Kolbe, who in Auschwitz did nobly volunteer to give his life to save another inmate (a non-Jew), but was not in the camp because of his Christianity and did not die for his faith, a condition of his canonization as a martyr, although others can certainly argue that out of his love for Christ he sacrificed his life for another inmate, and this action, inspired by his christianity, in essence is the same as dying because of his faith; and Kolbe was the author of an expressly antisemitic Catholic journal.

== Legacy ==
Since the Second Vatican Council, convened and closed by Pius XII's successors Pope John XXIII and Pope Paul VI there has been a marked change in the presentation of the Catholic Church's doctrine with regards to Judaism. In particular, Nostra aetate promulgated by Paul VI in 1965 was meant to usher in a new era of Catholic-Jewish relations. Some analysts view Nostra aetate as a "belated response to the Holocaust" and allege that "campaigns to convert Jews are no longer theologically acceptable in the Catholic Church".
