= Louis J. Gallagher =

American Jesuit academic

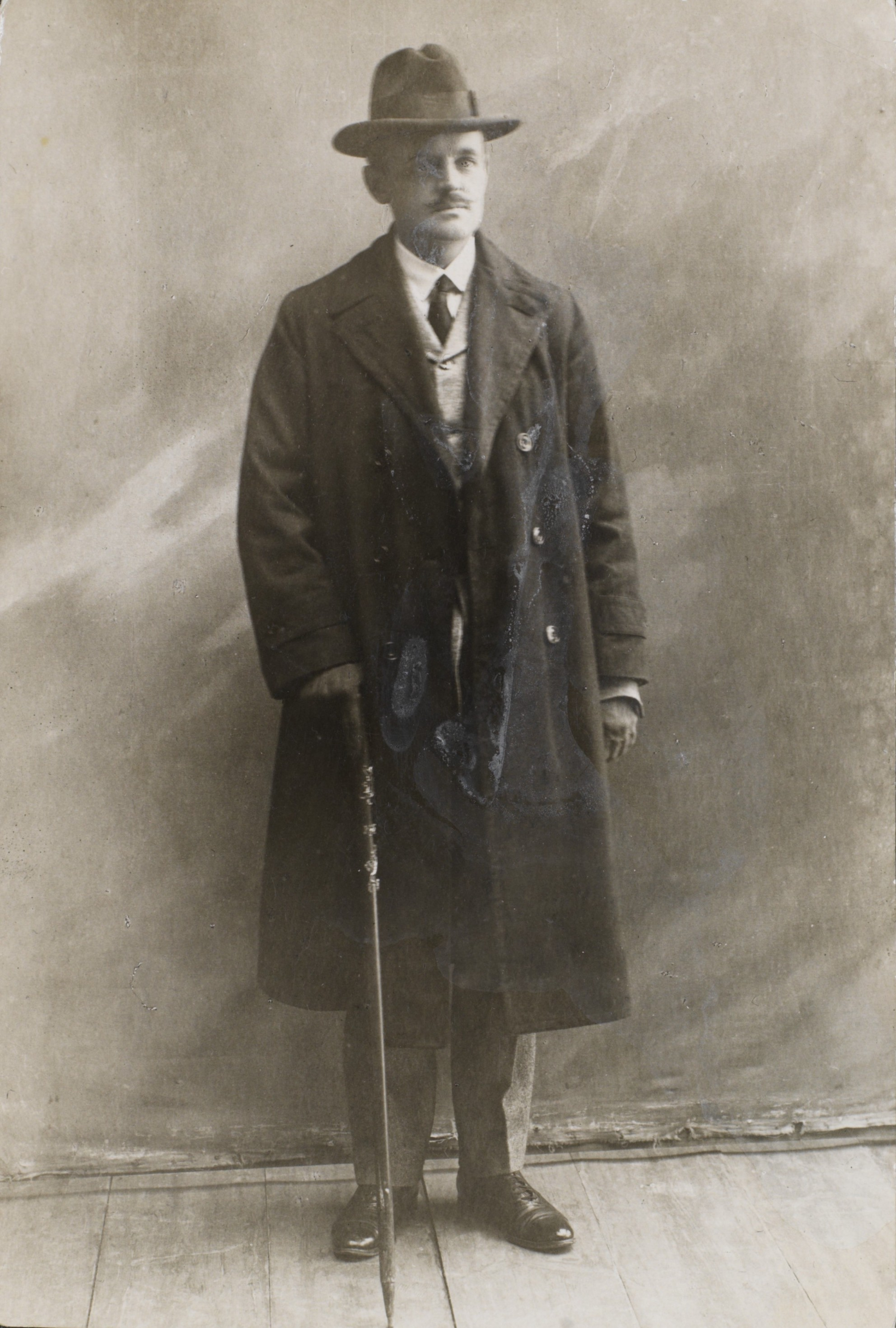
Gallagher in 1923

Louis J. Gallagher, SJ (July 22, 1885 – August 14, 1972) was an American Jesuit, known for his educational and literary work.

== Biography ==
Born in Boston on July 22, 1885, Louis J. Gallagher entered the Society of Jesus on August 15, 1905, was ordained as a priest in 1920, and worked as the headmaster of Xavier High School in New York City (1921–22).

In the aftermath of the Russian famine of 1921, Gallagher went to Russia as the Assistant Director of Papal Relief Mission, which was headed by Edmund A. Walsh (1922–23), also an American Jesuit and Gallagher's close friend. Besides providing help to the starving of the Volga, the two Jesuits had a special task, given to them by Pope Pius XI as one of the first things he did as the Pope: to "seek and find" the Holy Relics of their 17th-century colleague, Blessed Andrew Bobola, which had apparently disappeared from Polotsk during or soon after the Russian Civil War or the Soviet-Polish War. In September 1923 the Bolsheviks told the American Jesuits that Bobola's relics had been taken to a medical museum ("Hygiene Exhibition" of the People's Commissariat for Health in Moscow) and allowed them to be taken to the Vatican. Accordingly, on October 3 Walsh and Gallagher securely packed the body (later described by an American journalist as a "remarkably well-preserved mummy") at the museum, and took it to one of Moscow's train stations. Traveling as a diplomatic courier, Gallagher delivered the Holy Relics to the Vatican right in time for All Saints' Day (November 1) of 1923, by the way of Odessa, Istanbul and Brindisi.

Back in the US, Gallagher served as the Dean of the College of Arts and Sciences at Georgetown University (1924–26), Assistant to Provincial of the New England Province of the Society of Jesus (1926–32), and President of Boston College (1932–37).

In April 1938, the same Pius XI who had started his pontificate charging the two Jesuits in Moscow with the task of searching for Bobola's relics, had Bobola canonized, less than a year before his own death. The following year Gallagher published an English translation of the new Saint's biography.

Gallagher also was one of the founders of the Institute of Social Order (1941–43), and served as the archivist of the New England Province of the Society of Jesus, and later (1954–1970) as the historian for the Jesuits of Georgetown University.

When Edmund A. Walsh died in October 1956, Gallagher, described by a modern historian as Walsh's closest friend, wrote an obituary for him, which was published in the Jesuit journal Woodstock Letters in 1957. In 1962, Gallagher published his friend's biography, which remained the only book-length biography of Walsh until 2005.

Gallagher died in a Massachusetts hospital on August 14, 1972

== Literary work ==
Louis J. Gallagher wrote, or translated into English from Latin and Italian, a number of books, usually connected with the history of the Jesuit Order.

- The Test Heritage (1938)
- The life of Saint Andrew Bobola of the Society of Jesus, martyr, by Cesare Moreschini; translated by Louis J. Gallagher and Paul Vincent Donovan. B. Humphries, inc. (Boston), 1939.
- The China That Was (1942)
- China in the Sixteenth Century: The Journals of Matteo Ricci (1942; reprint 1953) - an English translation of Matteo Ricci and Nicolas Trigault's De Christiana expeditione apud Sinas suscepta ab Societate Jesu
- Episode on Beacon Hill (1950)
- Edmund A. Walsh, S.J., a Biography (1962)

== On the screen ==
It was reported in 2009 that the Polish director Robert Gliński was planning to shoot a movie about Walsh's and Gallagher's adventures in Russia, under the title Łowca dusz ("Soul Hunter").
