= De Christiana Expeditione apud Sinas =

Book by Nicolas Trigault

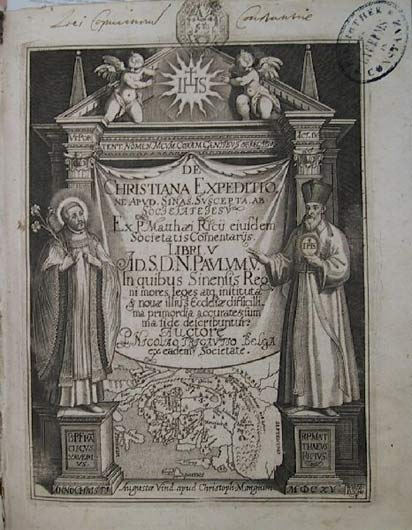
De Christiana Expeditione apud Sinas, Augsburg, 1615.

De Christiana Expeditione apud Sinas Suscepta ab Societate Jesu ... (Latin for "On the Christian Mission among the Chinese by the Society of Jesus ...") is a book based on an Italian manuscript written by the most important founding figure of the Jesuit China mission, Matteo Ricci (1552–1610), expanded and translated into Latin by his colleague Nicolas Trigault (1577–1628). The book was first published by Christoph Mang in 1615 in Augsburg.

The book's full title is De Christiana Expeditione apud Sinas Suscepta ab Societate Jesu. Ex P. Matthaei Riccii Eiusdem Societatis Commentariis Libri V: Ad S.D.N. Paulum V. in quibus Sinensis Regni Mores, Leges, atque Instituta, & Novae Illius Ecclesiae Difficillima Primordia Accurate & Summa Fide Describuntur ("Five Books on the Christian Expedition among the Chinese Undertaken by the Society of Jesus from the Commentaries of Fr. Matteo Ricci of the Same Society... in which the Customs, Laws, and Principles of the Chinese Kingdom and the Most Difficult First Beginnings of the New Church There Are Accurately and with Great Fidelity Described / authored by Fr. Nicolas Trigault, Belgian, of the Same Society," dedicated to Pope Paul V). As it indicates, the work contained an overview of the late Ming China's geography, politics, and culture, its philosophy and religions, and described the history of Christianity's inroads into China (primarily, the work of Ricci himself and his fellow Jesuits). The book articulated Ricci's approach for planting Christianity on the Chinese soil: an "accommodationist" policy, as later scholars called it, based on the premise of the essential compatibility between Christianity and Confucianism. With some evolutionary changes, this policy continued to guide Jesuit missionaries in China for the next century.

The first major book published in Europe by an author who was not only fluent in Chinese and conversant in Chinese culture but also had traveled over much of the country, Ricci-Trigault's work was highly popular, and went through at least 16 editions in a number of European languages in the several decades after its first publication. The existence of a Persian translation, created sometime in the second half of the 17th century in Delhi, reveals that the book also circulated in Mughal India.

== History of the book ==
The book is based primarily on "journals" written by the Italian Jesuit Matteo Ricci (1552–1610) during his 27 years of residence of China (1583–1610). After Ricci's death his papers, written in Italian, were found by his fellow Jesuits in his Beijing office. A handwritten copy was made, as well as a translation into Portuguese.

In 1612, the China Mission's Superior, Niccolo Longobardi appointed another Jesuit, Nicolas Trigault (1577–1628), known for his good Latin writing skills, as the China Mission's procurator (recruitment and PR representative) in Europe. One of his important tasks was bringing Ricci's journals to Europe and publishing them in a book form after translating them into Latin as well as expanding and editing them.

He sailed from Macau to India on February 9, 1613 and started to work on the manuscript already on shipboard. Other tasks interfered during the overland section of his westward journey to Europe (via the Persian Gulf, Persia, and Egypt) and his negotiations with the Jesuit leaders in Rome; but he managed to complete his work by 1615, when the book was published in Augsburg in 645 pages, plus introductory and index material. Trigault's preface was dated January 14, 1615.

French, German, Spanish, and Italian translations followed within the next six years. A Persian translation was achieved in the following decades.

Ricci's original Italian text was not published until the appearance of the Opere storiche del P. Matteo Ricci, S.J (Historical Works of Fr. Matteo Ricci, S.J.) in two volumes in 1911 and 1913. This edition, prepared by the Italian Jesuit historian Pietro Tacchi Venturi, contained Ricci's original text, under the title Commentari della Cina (Commentary on China), as well as Ricci's letters from China. However, Venturi's lack of knowledge of Chinese made it necessary for Fr. Pasquale d'Elia (1890–1963) to produce another, better annotated edition of Ricci's manuscripts (known as Fonti Ricciane) some 30 years later, in the 1940s. Notes provided by d'Elia (who had been a Jesuit missionary in China himself) contained the standard (Wade-Giles) transcription and Chinese characters for the Chinese names and words that appeared in Ricci's (and Ricci-Trigault's) text in Ricci's original transcription.

Excerpts from De Christiana Expeditione appeared in English in Purchas his Pilgrimes in 1625, under the title "A discourse of the Kingdome of China, taken out of Ricius and Trigautius, containing the countrey, people, government, religion, rites, sects, characters, studies, arts, acts;and a Map of China added, drawne out of one there made with Annotations for the understanding thereof".

A complete English translation of the Latin text, by the Jesuit Louis J. Gallagher was published in the US in 1942, with the preface and imprimatur of the Archbishop of Boston Richard Cushing. It was reprinted in 1953.

The standard Ricci-Trigault Latin edition, as well as most translations, are divided into five large sections ("books"). Book One is encyclopedic overview of the late-Ming China as seen by Ricci during his 27 years of living in the country, interacting with people of all walks of life, and reading Chinese literature. The other four books describe, in chronological order, the story of the Jesuit China missions before, during, and a few years after Ricci's "expedition" into China.

== China in Ricci's book ==
While the encyclopedic scope of De Christiana Expeditione... can be compared to that of The Travels of Marco Polo, or Juan González de Mendoza's Historia ... del gran reyno de la China (1585), its content reveals the author's much closer familiarity with China's language, culture, and people than that of the 13th-century Venetian traveler or the 16th-century Mexican bishop, because of Ricci's personal experiences and his studies of Chinese literature.

In his book, Ricci gives a brief overview of China's history and geography. He talks about its industry and agriculture, explaining the use of bamboo, coal mining and distribution system, tea production and drinking, and the lacquer technology. He describes Chinese architecture, music and theatre (he disliked the last two), and the practice, annoying to Ricci, of long banquets accompanied by theatrical performances. He tells the reader about using seals for signature and about highly valued writing implements; about artistically painted fans (whose role of a culture item in China he compares to that of gloves in his contemporary Europe) and about surprising similarity between Chinese and European furniture (both regions use chairs, tables, and beds, unlike most of other regions of Eurasia). He concludes his generally appreciative description of China's material culture with the thought, "One may gather from what has been said that there are numerous points of advantageous contacts between ourselves and the Chinese people."

When talking about the language, Ricci gives a brief overview of Chinese writing system, and the great distance between Literary Chinese and the spoken language as well as of the fact that the Literary Chinese was at the time shared by China, Japan, Ryukyu Islands, Korea, and Vietnam (Cochin), providing a medium for contact between the countries of the region.

He comments on the variety of Chinese dialects, as well as on the existence of the Guanhua, the predecessor of modern Standard Chinese, which he thought to be universally known to the educated classes throughout the empire.

Ricci pays a lot of attention to China's education system and the Imperial examination mechanism serving to form the scholar-bureaucrats ruling class of the empire, as well as to the system of state administration. He notes that unlike European monarchies of the day, the Ming Empire prohibited all male relatives of the emperor from occupying any official post or even from leaving their fiefs without permission, and greatly disapproves the use of eunuchs, "a meager looking class, uneducated and brought up in perpetual slavery, a dull and stolid lot", in the administration of the state.

Ricci finds it "a source of regret that [the Chinese] do not get rid themselves" of the complicated and time-consuming ceremonies used to express relations between superiors and inferiors or even between friends.

== Ricci's view of Chinese religions ==
Ricci's attitude to China's beliefs and religious (or civic) rites is nuanced. He disparages Buddhism and Taoism as an "unnatural and hideous fiction of idol worship" but views the teaching of Confucius as moral, rather than religious, in nature and perfectly compatible with or even complementary to Christianity.

=== Buddhism ===
Ricci refers to Chinese Buddhism as the "sect... known as Sciequia (釋迦, Shijia, Shakyamuni) or Omitose (阿彌陀佛, Amituo Fo, Amitābha)", and is aware of it being brought from India, supposedly after an emperor had a prophetic dream in 65 AD.

Ricci discerns in Buddhist beliefs a number of concepts that he views as influenced by Western thinking: the Buddhist concept of transmigration of souls is similar to that of Pythagoras, and even the Chinese Five Elements are nothing but a "foolish" extension of the western Four Elements. Furthermore, the Jesuit author notices a number of similarities between Buddhist and Christian practices: teaching of rewards and punishments in afterlife, existence of monasticism and appreciation of celibacy, close similarity between Buddhist chanting and Gregorian chant, ecclesiastical statuary and vestments, and even existence in the Buddhist doctrine of "a certain trinity in which three different gods are fused into one deity". Ricci explains the similarities by hypothesizing Christian influence on Buddhism, as transmitted by Indians to Chinese in 1st century AD, in particular because of the preaching of Bartholomew the Apostle in northern India.

Ricci thought that perhaps the emperor's dream in 65 AD, or just "reports about the truths contained in the Christian Gospel", called him to get Christianity into the country. However, "the Chinese received a false importation in place of the truth they were seeking".

Ricci viewed Buddhist monks ("Osciami", 和尚們, Heshangmen) as "vile and abject".

=== Taoism ===
Ricci gives a brief account of the Tausu (道士, Daoshi), the followers of Lauzu (Laozi, 老子), and their books "written in rather elegant literary style". He mentions their three main gods, which, to him, like the "Buddhist trinity" he had mentioned, is in indication of the "father of lies" persevering at "his ambitious desire of divine similitude".

Ricci also gives the story of the "present reigning lord of heaven" Ciam (Zhang) having usurped that position from the previous Lord, Leu (Liu) and mentions "those who have been taken bodily into heaven". Elsewhere, the Ciam is described as "the original high priest" of Taoism, possibly referring to Zhang Daoling.

=== Confucianism ===
On the other hand, he feels that the teaching of Confucius is moral, rather than religious, in nature and perfectly compatible with or even complementary to Christianity.

=== Occult practices ===
Ricci strongly criticizes alchemy, fortune-telling, palmistry, astrology, and geomancy as "absurd superstitions" of the heathens.

Ricci is annoyed by the "addiction" of many educated Chinese to alchemy (aiming at prolonging life or converting base metals into silver), particularly because a number of people he met came to him for a wrong reason: hoping to learn the secret of converting mercury into silver. That belief, as Ricci himself explained, was based on the observation that the Portuguese bought a lot of mercury in China, exported it and brought silver back into the country.

De Christiana Expeditione apud Sinas may have been the first book to tell Europeans about feng shui (geomancy). Ricci's account tells about feng shui masters (geologi, in Latin) studying prospective construction sites or grave sites "with reference to the head and the tail and the feet of the particular dragons which are supposed to dwell beneath that spot". Ricci compared the "recondite science" of geomancy with that of astrology, viewing it as yet another superstitio absurdissima: "What could be more absurd than their imagining that the safety of a family, honors, and their entire existence must depend upon such trifles as a door being opened from one side or another, as rain falling into a courtyard from the right or from the left, a window opened here or there, or one roof being higher than another?"

== Editions available ==
- De Christiana Expeditione apud Sinas Suscepta ab Societate Jesu (1615) – original (Trigault's) Latin text on Archive.org
- A discourse of the Kingdome of China, taken out of Ricius and Trigautius, containing the countrey, people, government, religion, rites, sects, characters, studies, arts, acts; and a Map of China added, drawne out of one there made with Annotations for the understanding thereof, and A continuation of the Jesuites Acts and observations in China till Ricius his death and some yeers after. Of Hanceu or Quinsay. (excerpts from De Christiana Expeditione, in English translation) in Purchas his Pilgrimes, Volume XII (1625), Chapters VII and VIII. The two preceding chapters, V and VI, also contain related Jesuit accounts. Can be found in the full text of "Hakluytus posthumus" on archive.org. The book also appears on Google Books, but only in snippet view.
- Gallagher (1953). China in the Sixteenth Century: The Journals of Matteo Ricci, Random House, New York, 1953. English translation of Trigault's Latin by Louis J. Gallagher. (Only snippet view on Google Books)
- Pasquale M. d'Elia, Matteo Ricci. Fonti ricciane: documenti originali concernenti Matteo Ricci e la storia delle prime relazioni tra l'Europa e la Cina (1579–1615), Libreria dello Stato, 1942 – Ricci's original Italian text (not published until the early 20th century)

== Bibliography ==
- C. Dehaisnes, Vie du Père Nicolas Trigault, Tournai 1861
- P.M. D’Elia, Daniele Bartoli e Nicola Trigault, «Rivista Storica Italiana», s. V, III, 1938, 77–92
- G.H. Dunne, Generation of Giants, Notre Dame (Indiana), 1962, 162–182
- L. Fezzi, Osservazioni sul De Christiana Expeditione apud Sinas Suscepta ab Societate Iesu di Nicolas Trigault, «Rivista di Storia e Letteratura Religiosa» 1999, 541–566
- T.N. Foss, Nicholas Trigault, S.J. – Amanuensis or Propagandist? The Rôle of the Editor of Della entrata della Compagnia di Giesù e Christianità nella Cina, in Lo Kuang (a cura di), International Symposium on Chinese-Western Cultural Interchange in Commemoration of the 400th Anniversary of the Arrival of Matteo Ricci, S.J. in China. Taipei, Taiwan, Republic of China. September 11–16, 1983, II, Taipei, 1983, 1–94
- J. Gernet, Della Entrata della Compagnia di Giesù e Cristianità nella Cina de Matteo Ricci (1609) et les remaniements de sa traduction latine (1615), «Académie des Inscriptions & Belles Lettres. Comptes Rendus» 2003, 61–84
- E. Lamalle, La propagande du P. Nicolas Trigault en faveur des missions de Chine (1616), «Archivum Historicum Societatis Iesu», IX, 1940, 49–120
