= Nicolas Trigault =

French Jesuit, missionary and writer (1577–1628)

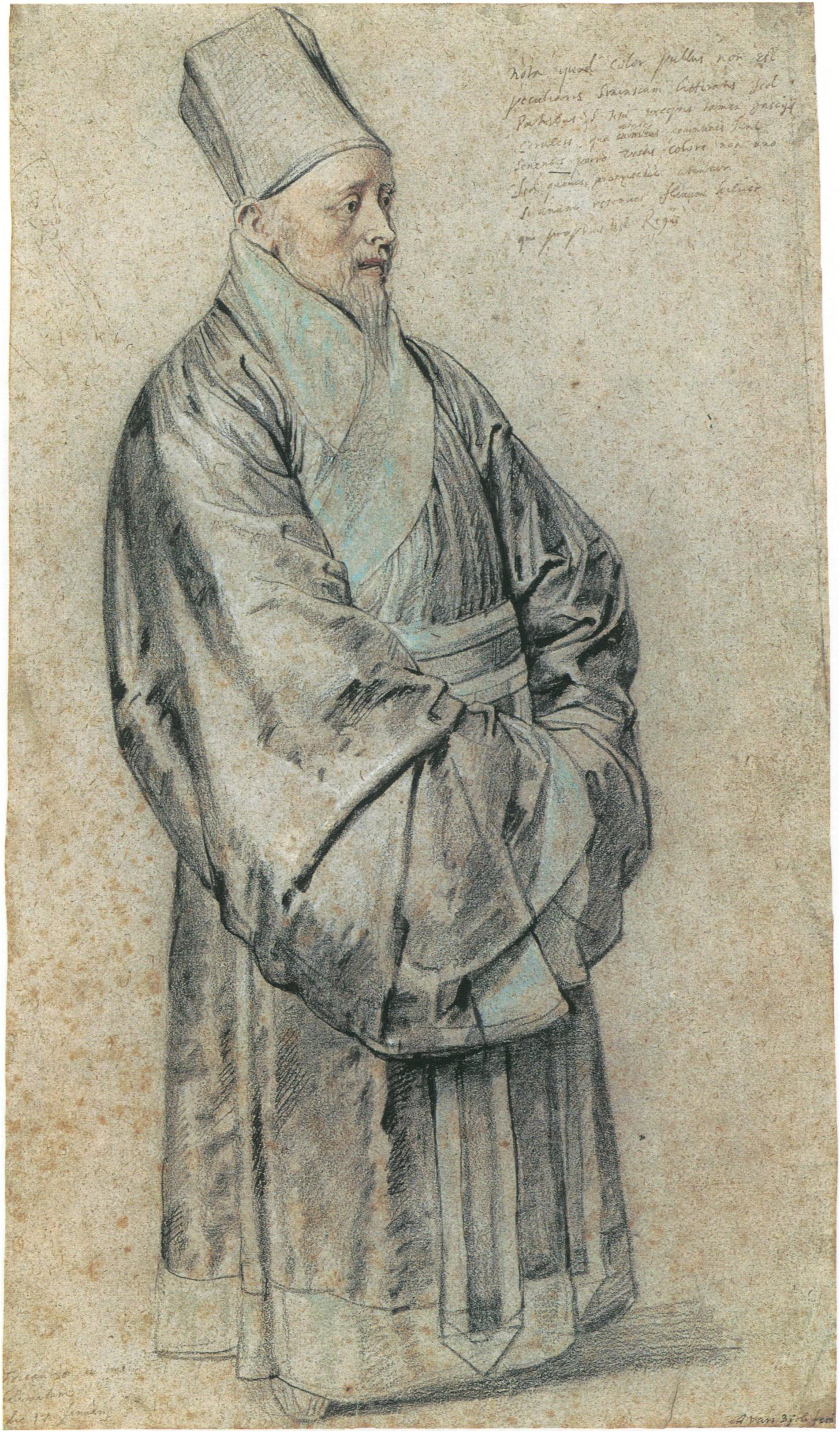
Nicolas Trigault in Chinese costume, by Peter Paul Rubens, the Metropolitan Museum of Art

Nicolas Trigault (1577–1628) was a Jesuit, and a missionary in China. He was also known by his Latinised name Nicolaus Trigautius or Trigaultius, and his Chinese name Jin Nige (simplified Chinese: 金尼阁; traditional Chinese: 金尼閣; pinyin: Jīn Nígé).

== Life and work ==
Born in Douai (then part of the County of Flanders in the Spanish Netherlands, now part of France), he became a Jesuit in 1594. Trigault left Europe to do missionary work in Asia around 1610, eventually arriving at Nanjing, China in 1611. He was later brought by the Chinese Catholic Li Zhizao to his hometown of Hangzhou where he worked as one of the first missionaries ever to reach that city and was eventually to die there in 1628.

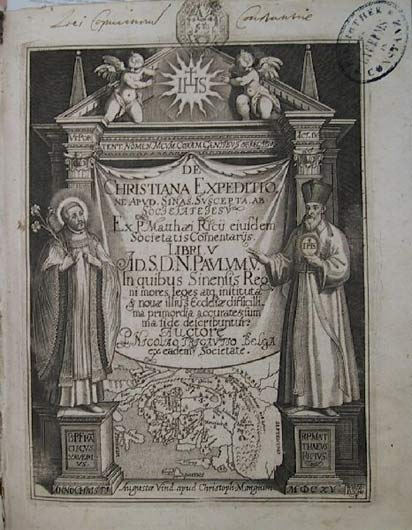
De Christiana expeditione apud Sinas, by Nicolas Trigault and Matteo Ricci, Augsburg, 1615.

In late 1612, Trigault was appointed by the China Mission's Superior, Niccolo Longobardi as the China Mission's procurator (recruitment and PR representative) in Europe. He sailed from Macau on February 9, 1613, and arrived in Rome on October 11, 1614, by way of India, the Persian Gulf and Egypt. His tasks involved reporting on the mission's progress to Pope Paul V, successfully negotiating with the Jesuit Order's General Claudio Acquaviva the independence of the China Mission from the Japan Mission, and traveling around Europe to raise money and publicize the work of the Jesuit missions. Peter Paul Rubens did a portrait of Trigault on 17 January 1617, when Trigault was either in Antwerp or Brussels (at right).

It was during this trip to Europe that Trigault edited and translated (from Italian to Latin) Matteo Ricci's "China Journal", or De Christiana expeditione apud Sinas. (He, in fact, started the work aboard the ship when sailing from Macau to India). The work was published in 1615 in Augsburg; it was later translated into many European languages and widely read. The French translation, which appeared in 1616, was translated from Latin by Trigault's own nephew, David-Floris de Riquebourg-Trigault.

In April 1618, Trigault sailed from Lisbon with over 20 newly recruited Jesuit missionaries, and arrived in Macau in April 1619.

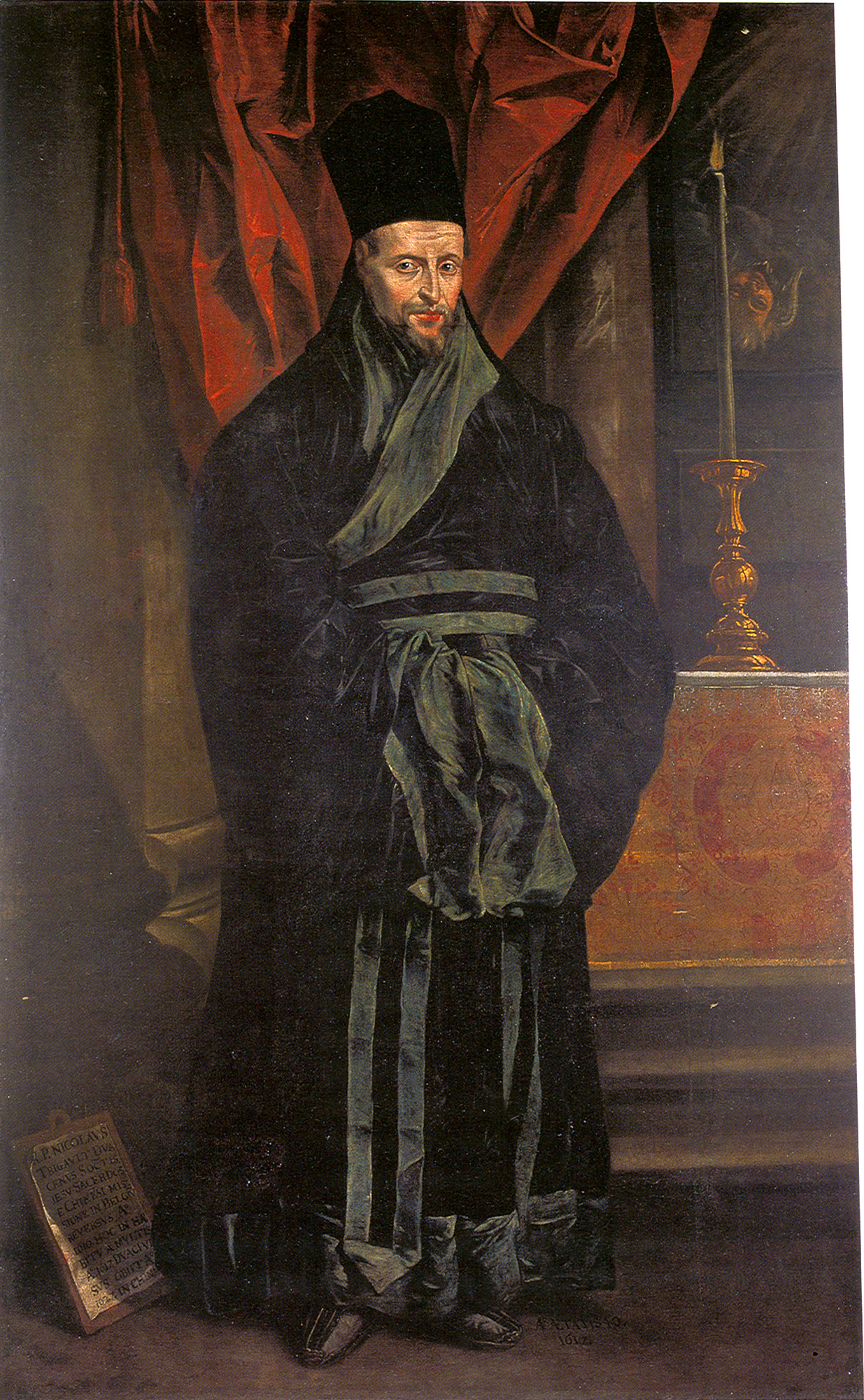
Portrait of Nicolas Trigault, by Rubens workshop, Musée de la Chartreuse de Douai

Trigault produced one of the first systems of Chinese Romanisation (based mostly on Ricci's and Pantoja's earlier work) in 1626, in his work Xiru Ermu Zi (simplified Chinese: 西儒耳目资; traditional Chinese: 西儒耳目資; pinyin: Xīrú ěrmù zī; lit. 'Aid to the Eyes and Ears of Western Literati'). Trigault wrote his book in Shanxi province.

Aided by a converted Chinese, he also produced the first Chinese version of Aesop's Fables (況義 "Analogy"), published in 1625.

In the 1620s, Trigault became involved in a dispute over the correct Chinese terminology for the Christian God and defended the use of the term Shangdi that had been prohibited in 1625 by the Jesuit Superior General Muzio Vitelleschi. André Palmeiro, the Society of Jesus inspector assigned the task of investigating and reporting on the circumstances of Trigault's death in 1628, on information from Trigault's confessor Lazzaro Cattaneo, stated that a mentally unstable Trigault had become deeply depressed after failing to successfully defend the use of the term, and had committed suicide.

== Publications ==
- De Christiana expeditione apud Sinas, Nicolas Trigault and Matteo Ricci
- Xiru Ermu Zi (西儒耳目資 "Aid to the Eyes and Ears of Western Literati")
Part 1 of 西儒耳目資, "Aid to the Eyes and Ears of Western Literati" by Nicolas Trigault

Part 2 of 西儒耳目資, "Aid to the Eyes and Ears of Western Literati" by Nicolas Trigault

Part 3 of 西儒耳目資, "Aid to the Eyes and Ears of Western Literati" by Nicolas Trigault

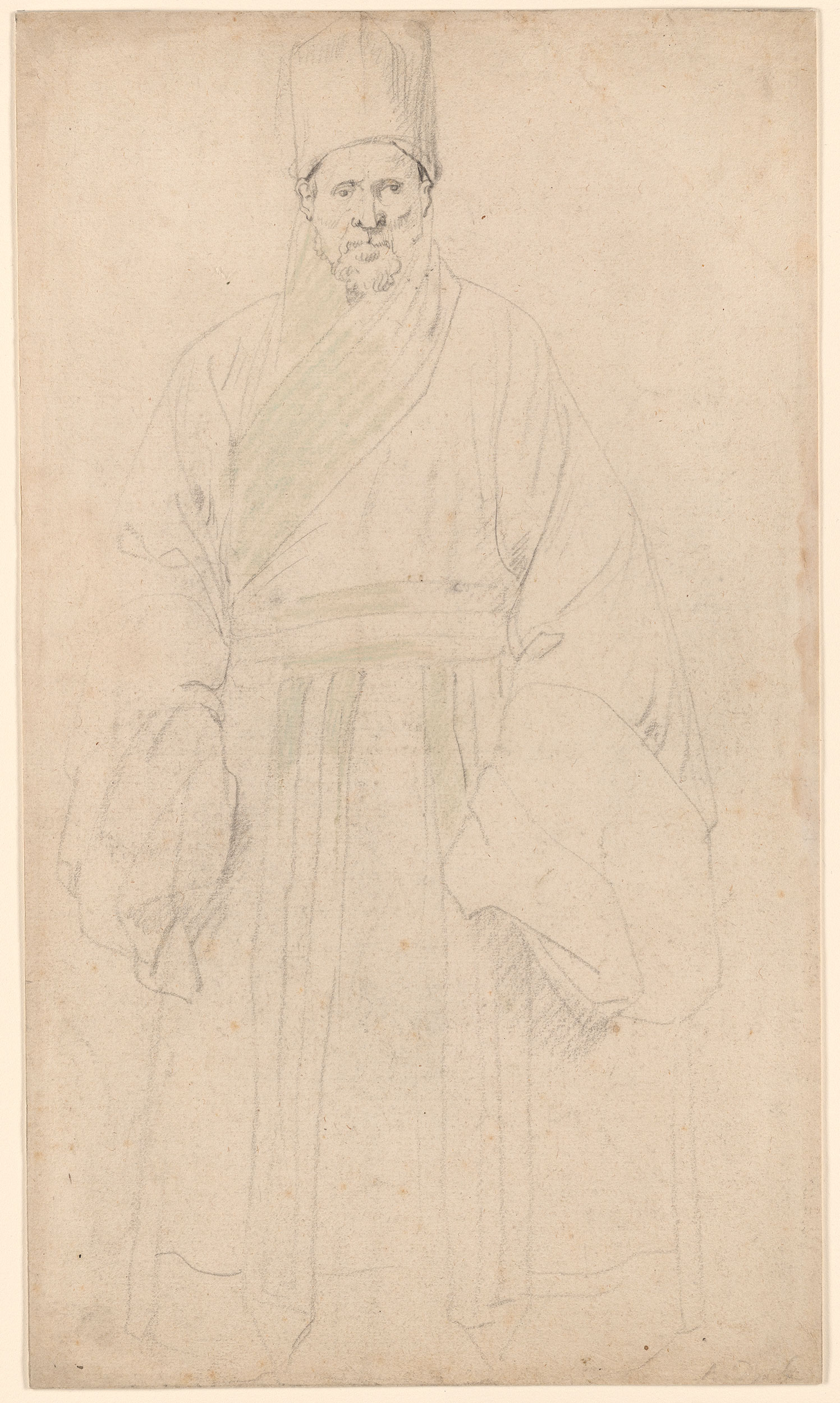
Nicolas Trigault in Chinese Costume by Anthony van Dyck

== See also ==
- Jesuit China missions
- Immaculate Conception Cathedral of Hangzhou
- Three Pillars of Chinese Catholicism
- Francisco Varo
