= James Ford Bell Lecture =

The James Ford Bell Lecture has been delivered annually since 1964 in the James Ford Bell Library at the University of Minnesota on a topic relating to the collections of the Library.

== List of the published James Ford Bell Lectures ==
- 5. Saints and sinners at sea by Vincent H. Cassidy. [Minneapolis]: The Associates of the James Ford Bell Library, 1968.
- 6. On book collecting: the story of my Drake library by Hans P. Kraus. [Minneapolis]: The Associates of the James Ford Bell Library, 1969.
- 7. Pehr Kalm and the image of North America by Nils William Olsson. [Minneapolis]: The Associates of the James Ford Bell Library, 1970.
- 8 All the peoples of the world are men by Lewis Hanke. Minneapolis: The Associates of the James Ford Bell Library, University of Minnesota, 1970.
- 9 The exploration of Canada: some geographical considerations by Eric W. Morse. Minneapolis: The Associates of the James Ford Bell Library, University of Minnesota, 1971.
- 10 The Barbary pirates: victims and the scourage of Christendom by Paul W. Bamford. Minneapolis: The Associates of the James Ford Bell Library, University of Minnesota, 1972.
- 12 The economy and society of colonial Brazil: a brief overview by Stuart B. Schwartz. Minneapolis: The Associates of the James Ford Bell Library, University of Minnesota, 1974.
- 13 The European presence in West Africa before 1800 by Victoria Bomba Coifman. Minneapolis: The Associates of the James Ford Bell Library, University of Minnesota, 1975.
- 14 The Minnesota Vincent of Beauvais manuscript and Cistercian thirteenth-century book decoration by Alison Stones. Minneapolis: The Association of The James Ford Bell Library, University of Minnesota, 1977.
- 15 The orderly landscape: landscape tastes and the United States survey by Hildegard Binder Johnson. Minneapolis: The Associates of the James Ford Bell Library, University of Minnesota, 1977.
- 16 The efficient plantation and the inefficient hacienda by Ward Barrett. Minneapolis: The Associates of the James Ford Bell Library, University of Minnesota, 1979.
- 17 The bay where Hudson did winter by Linden J. Lundstrom. Minneapolis: The Associates of the James Ford Bell Library, University of Minnesota, 1980.
- 18 Reversing the telescope: Louis Hennepin and three hundred years of historical perspective by Rhoda R. Gilman. Minneapolis: The Associates of the James Ford Bell Library, University of Minnesota, 1981.
- 19 By inch of candle: a sale at East-India-House, 21 September 1675 by Otto Charles Thieme. Minneapolis: The Associates of the James Ford Bell Library, University of Minnesota, 1982.
- 20 In search of silk: Adam Olearius’ mission to Russia and Persia by Gerhard H. Weiss. Minneapolis: The Associates of the James Ford Bell Library, University of Minnesota, 1983.
- 21 Technology transfer and cultural subversion: tensions in the early Jesuit mission to China by Edward L. Farmer. Minneapolis: The Associates of the James Ford Bell Library, University of Minnesota, 1983.
- 22 Sir Joseph Banks and the origins of science policy by A. Hunter Dupree. Minneapolis: The Associates of the James Ford Bell Library, University of Minnesota, 1984.
- 23 Pirates: myths and realities by Robert C. Ritchie. [Minneapolis]: The Associates of the James Ford Bell Library, University of Minnesota, 1986.
- 24 Life at sea in the sixteenth century: the landlubber’s lament of Eugenio de Salazar [translated] by Carla Rahn Phillips. [Minneapolis]: The Associates of the James Ford Bell Library, University of Minnesota, 1987.
- 25 Goods, ideas, and values: the East Indies trade as an agent of change in eighteenth-century Sweden by Michael F. Metcalf. [Minneapolis]: The Associates of the James Ford Bell Library, University of Minnesota, 1988.
- 26 Representations of slavery: John Gabriel Stedman’s "Minnesota" manuscripts by Richard Price. [Minneapolis]: The Associates of the James Ford Bell Library, University of Minnesota, 1989.
- 27 Towards superiority: European and Indian medicine, 1500-1700 by M. N. Pearson. [Minneapolis]: The Associates of the James Ford Bell Library, University of Minnesota, 1989.
- 28 Disease and imperialism before the nineteenth century by Philip D. Curtin. [Minneapolis]: The Associates of the James Ford Bell Library, University of Minnesota, 1990.
- 29 Richard Eden, advocate of empire by John "Jack" Parker. [Minneapolis]: The Associates of the James Ford Bell Library, University of Minnesota, 1991.
- 30 The making of an elite enterprise: the Jesuits in the Portuguese Assistancy, 16th to 18th centuries by Dauril Alden. [Minneapolis]: Associates of the James Ford Bell Library, University of Minnesota, 1992.
- 31 My long journey with National Geographic by Merle Severy. [Minneapolis]: Associates of the James Ford Bell Library, University of Minnesota, 1993.
- 32 Moravian missionaries at work in a Jamaican slave community, 1754-1835 by Richard S. Dunn. [Minneapolis]: The Associates of the James Ford Bell Library, University of Minnesota, 1994.
- 33 The medieval origins of European expansion by William D. Phillips, Jr. [Minneapolis]: Associates of the James Ford Bell Library, University of Minnesota, 1996.
- 34 "The four parts of the world": Giovanni Francesco Camocio’s wall maps by David Woodward. [Minneapolis]: Associates of the James Ford Bell Library, 1997.
- 35 Thomas Forrest: Renaissance seaman by Joseph E. Schwartzberg. [Minneapolis]: Associates of the James Ford Bell Library, University of Minnesota, 1998.
- 36 An epic American exploration: the friendship of Lewis and Clark by Stephen E. Ambrose. [Minneapolis]: Associates of the James Ford Bell Library, 1998.
- 37 Learning from legends on the James Ford Bell Library mappamundi by Scott D. Westrem. [Minneapolis]: Associates of the James Ford Bell Library, 2000.
- 38 Emperor Charles V’s crusades against Tunis and Algiers: appearance and reality by James D. Tracy. [Minneapolis, MN]: Associates of the James Ford Bell Library, 2001.
- 39 Continuity and discontinuity in the sixteenth-century New World by Felipe Fernández-Armesto. [Minneapolis]: Associates of the James Ford Bell Library, 2001.
- 40 Acquisition of rare books, manuscripts and maps: a curator’s commentary by Carol Urness. [Minneapolis]: Associates of the James Ford Bell Library, University of Minnesota, 2005.

== Sources ==
- University of Minnesota Library Catalogue
