= Thomas Sadler Roberts =

American physician

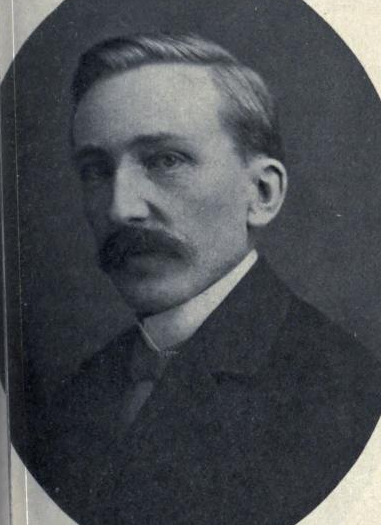
Portrait from Bird Lore (1903)

Thomas Sadler Roberts (February 16, 1858 – April 19, 1946) was an American physician known for his work in ornithology, bird conservation and for his book The Birds of Minnesota (1932), a comprehensive account on the birds of the Minnesota area. Roberts was an influential educator on birds and their conservation and helped establish the Bell Museum of Natural History. Thomas Sadler Roberts Bird Sanctuary in Minneapolis is named after him. He was among the many ornithologists who saw the last flocks of the passenger pigeon in Minneapolis.

== Biography ==
Roberts was born to John Roberts and his wife, a family of Welsh Quaker origins, in Philadelphia. His early life was spent in Germantown and later to Minnesota where his father moved after being diagnosed with tuberculosis.

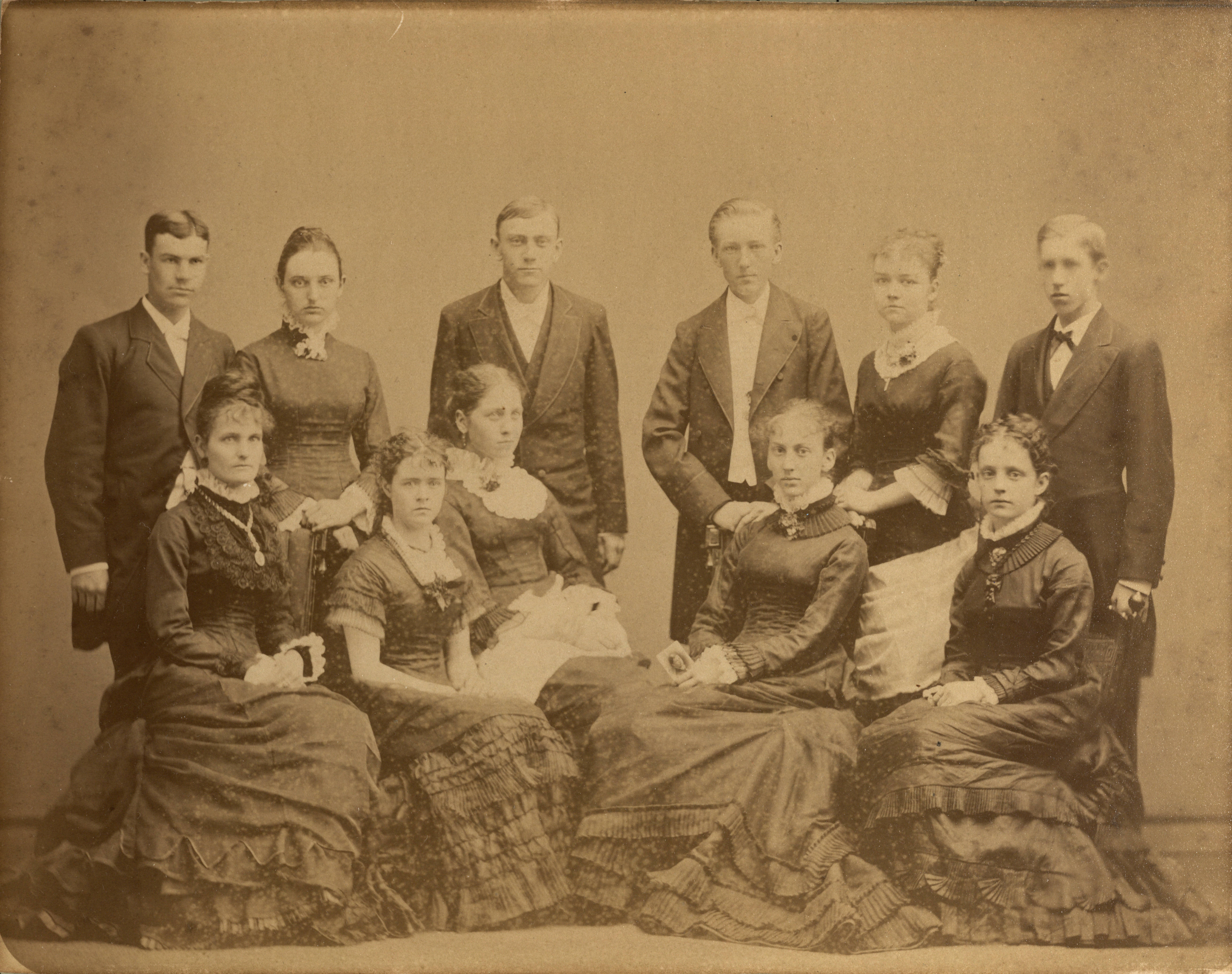
Minneapolis High School Class of 1877. Roberts is standing third from right.

He grew up in the countryside and took an interest in natural history. He learned to skin birds from Franklin Benner who he met in June 1874. Between the age of 16 and 18 he collected and preserved nearly 600 specimens. In 1876, at the age of 18, he and several other friends from the Minneapolis High School established the Young Naturalists' Society in Minneapolis with Roberts as a secretary. Another member of this group was Clarence Luther Herrick. In his younger days, Roberts accompanied his father to shoot birds including the passenger pigeon and upland sandpiper for food. It was after 1874 that he began to carefully make notes on them. Along with Benner and Clarence Herrick, he observed nests and collected eggs. The Young Naturalists' Society was key in influencing Roberts. They discussed many topics and read books. One member Robert Williams, whose father owned a bookstore and had access to a library known as the Minneapolis Athenaeum, made it possible for them to research many of their observations. The collection included John James Audubon's Birds of America. The group read George Perkins Marsh's Man and Nature. Several member of the group continued to write notes on science in later life. In his valedictory talk at the Minneapolis High School in 1877 Roberts spoke about how money was sought with vengeance by society and noted that in order to be truly happy one needed "recreation for the mind".

In 1882 he joined the University of Pennsylvania medical school and graduated MD in 1885. He worked in Philadelphia hospitals before returning to Minneapolis to practice. For a while he maintained a private practice. He trained his office assistant Mabel Densmore in the study of birds and she later became an accomplished ornithologist. From 1887 he served at St. Barnabas Hospital as chief of staff and from 1901 to 1913, taught pediatrics at the University of Minnesota medical school.

In 1898 Roberts took to bird photography, often consulting Frank Chapman on the subject. While in St. Barnabas, he met Leslie Dart, another doctor with an interest in birds. In 1914 Roberts served as a doctor on the Hildebret a yacht in the Everglades that was used by his patient James Stroud Bell who had been advised that the Florida sun could improve his health. Bell's son James Ford Bell was also aboard. During this visit, Roberts also met Frank Chapman at Ormond. James Ford Bell later helped Roberts establish a museum at the University of Minnesota. The Bell Museum of Natural History occupied Roberts after his retirement from medical practice. He died at Eitel hospital where he was taken after a heart attack. He is buried at Lakewood Cemetery in a family plot.

== The Birds of Minnesota ==
Roberts' took up the work to document the birds of Minnesota after several of his friends died and his wife had become invalid. He hired Allan Brooks to paint many of the plates for the book. He was assisted by many of his friends and his assistant Mabel Densmore. The second volume of the book included a key to the species. A second edition was published in 1936.

== Personal life ==
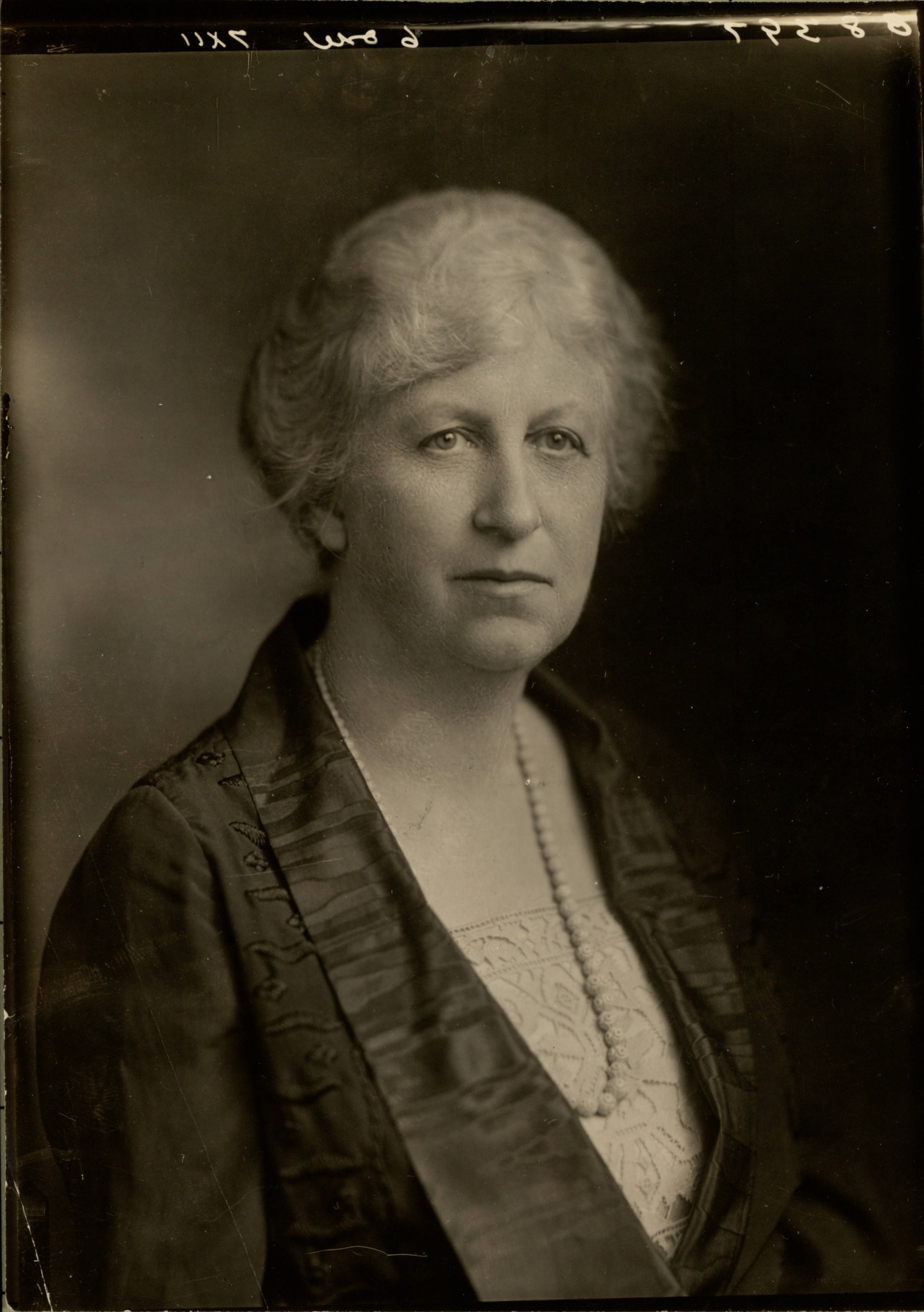
Jane Cleveland Roberts

Roberts married Jane Cleveland in 1887 and they had two sons and a daughter. After her death in 1932 he married Agnes Williams Harley in 1937. Roberts' sister Emma was a botanical artist. Agnes was a friend of his sister Emma and shared a botanical interest and they produced a collection of botanical illustrations which are now held in the Andersen Horticultural Library at the University of Minnesota.

== Awards ==
Roberts received the AOU's Brewster Medal in 1938 and a Sigma Xi letter of commendation for work in science in 1941.

T.S. Roberts Wildlife Sanctuary was named after him on the southeastern shore of Lake Harriet in 1947.
