= Thomas Sadler Roberts Bird Sanctuary =

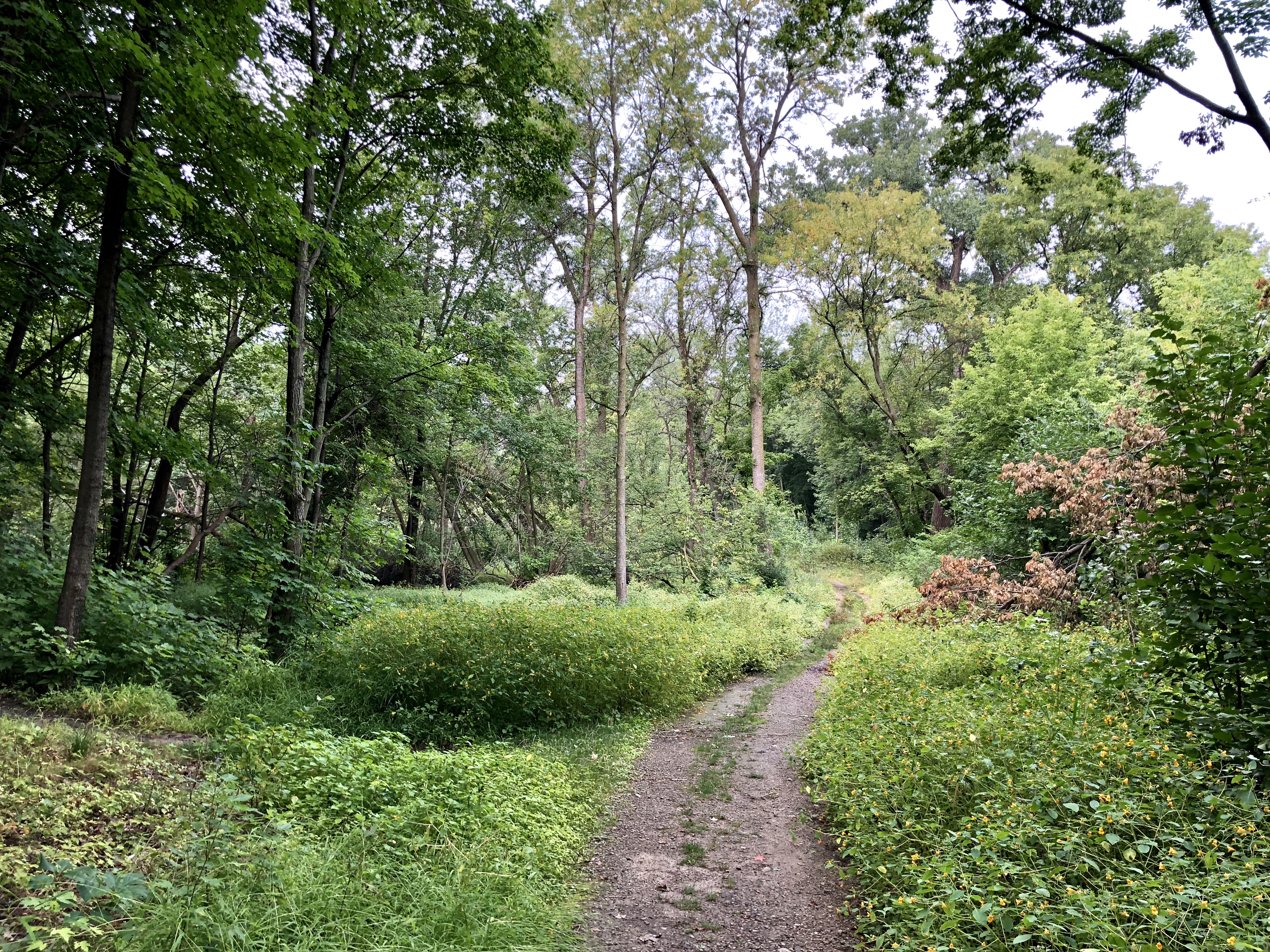
- Walking trail, Roberts Bird Sanctuary
- Interactive map of Thomas Sadler Roberts Bird Sanctuary
- Type: Wildlife refuge
- Location: Minneapolis, Minnesota
- Coordinates: 44.9290132°N 93.3049208°W
- Area: 31 acres (13 ha)
- Administrator: Minneapolis Park and Recreation Board
- Website: www.minneapolisparks.org/parks__destinations/gardens__bird_sanctuaries/roberts_bird_sanctuary

The Thomas Sadler Roberts Bird Sanctuary is situated within Lyndale Park, a Minneapolis city park on the northeast side of Lake Harriet and part of Minneapolis’ Chain of Lakes Regional Park. The main entrance to the sanctuary is in the Lyndale Park Gardens parking lot. Trailheads are accessible through the back of the Peace Garden, and from the parking lot northeast of the Lake Harriet bandshell.

Named after Thomas Sadler Roberts, a retired doctor who had become a professor of ornithology at the University of Minnesota and director of the university's Museum of Natural History, the sanctuary was officially designated in 1936 by the Minneapolis Park and Recreation Board (MPRB), at the request of the Minnesota Audubon Society.

Primarily a sanctuary for migratory songbirds in the spring, the sanctuary comprises 31 acres (13 ha). It has been designated an Important Bird Area by the National Audubon Society.
