= Bell Museum of Natural History =

Natural history museum of the University of Minnesota

Bell Museum

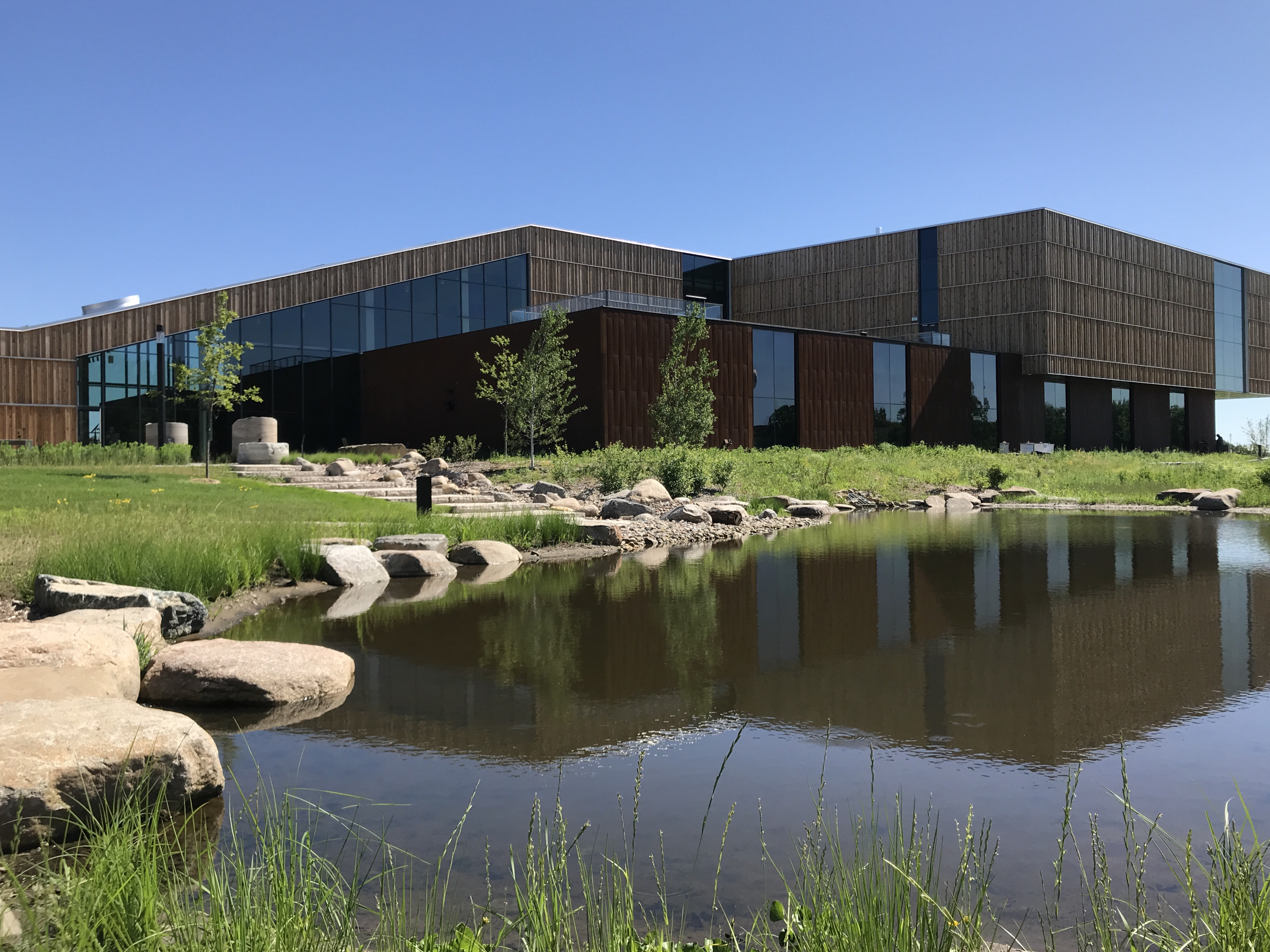
- The Bell Museum in 2018
- Established: 1872
- Location: 2088 Larpenteur Ave W, Falcon Heights, MN 55113 on the St. Paul campus of the University of Minnesota
- Coordinates: 44°59′29″N 93°11′17″W
- Type: Natural History of Minnesota
- Director: Holly Menninger
- Owner: University of Minnesota
- Website: bellmuseum.umn.edu

The Bell Museum, formerly known as the James Ford Bell Museum of Natural History, is located at the University of Minnesota's Saint Paul campus. The museum's current location on the Saint Paul campus opened in 2018. The Minnesota wildlife dioramas focus on animal specimens native to the state. The museum also houses the digital Whitney and Elizabeth MacMillan Planetarium. The museum is part of the university's College of Food, Agricultural and Natural Resource Sciences. The museum's former location on University of Minnesota's Minneapolis campus closed in January 2017.

== History ==
"...as an act to provide for a geological and natural history survey of the state. And in turn, that natural history and geological specimens be prepared, and a museum be established at the University.".

The museum was established by a state legislative mandate in 1872 to collect, preserve, prepare, display, and interpret Minnesota's diverse animal and plant life for scholarly research, teaching, public appreciation, enrichment, and enjoyment. Its governance belongs, by state legislative designation, to the University of Minnesota.

The museum was first located in a single room in a building on the University of Minnesota's Minneapolis campus. The museum was reorganized by physician and ornithologist Thomas Sadler Roberts with the help of his friend James Ford Bell, who covered half the cost ($150,000) for a new building to house nature dioramas. Bell wanted the university to add a diorama of gray wolves in their natural environment, in order to promote their conservation, since the state paid hunters a bounty for killing wolves in the 1930s. The remaining funds were raised through donations and federal government funding, and the James Ford Bell Museum of Natural History opened in 1940 at University Avenue and Church Street. The building was expanded in the 1960s and 1970s, but by the 1980s the building was suffering from leaks, cracks, mold and water damage, which threatened the collections and the dioramas.

=== New building details ===
After decade-long planning and legislative process, the Minnesota Legislative session passed a bonding bill in funding for the new facility in 2014. The agreement allowed the university to borrow $51.5 million for the project and the state would pay the debt service on the bonds over a span of 25 years. The university broke ground on the project on Earth Day, April 22, 2016.

Perkins and Will designed the new Bell Museum building. The museum is on the Saint Paul campus of the University of Minnesota at 2088 Larpenteur Ave W, Falcon Heights, MN New enhancements include an outdoor learning landscape, a dedicated parking lot, and new permanent and temporary exhibit galleries. The estimated project budget of the new facility and moving is $64.2 million.

== Collections ==
With more than 4 million specimens, the Bell's scientific collections have provided opportunities for research and teaching since the museum's inception in 1872. In 2016, the museum launched the Minnesota Biodiversity Atlas, an online, searchable interface integrating over 5 terabytes of data from the Bell Museum on birds, mammals, fishes, plants, and fungi to enhance research capacity to perform a range of activities from biological surveys to conservation planning. (bellatlas.umn.edu) This database contains over 400,000 scientific records and as many as 175,000 high-resolution images with plans to expand entries and specimen photographs.

Amphibian and Reptile Collection
The Amphibian and Reptile Collection is a diverse collection that has a heavy focus on the upper Midwest.

Bird Collection
The Bird Collection specimens come from the upper Midwest and the majority of these are from Minnesota. The Bell Museum features both a research and teaching collection.

Fish Collection
The Fish Collection contain specimens from the Menage expedition to the Philippines in the 1890s, fish from Hawaii collected in the early 1900s, and many other specimens from across the continental United States.

Fungi Collection
About 10% of the Fungi Collection is Minnesotan fungi, and the rest of the collection is from around the world.

Lichen Collection
The Lichen Collection is one of the largest lichen collections in the US, and one of the few fully digitalized in the world. It houses collections of lichens from around the world.

Invertebrate Collection
The Mollusks and Crustaceans Invertebrate Collection houses freshwater mollusks collected in Minnesota. The invertebrate collection holds the old Minneapolis Library collection of Indo-Pacific mollusks.

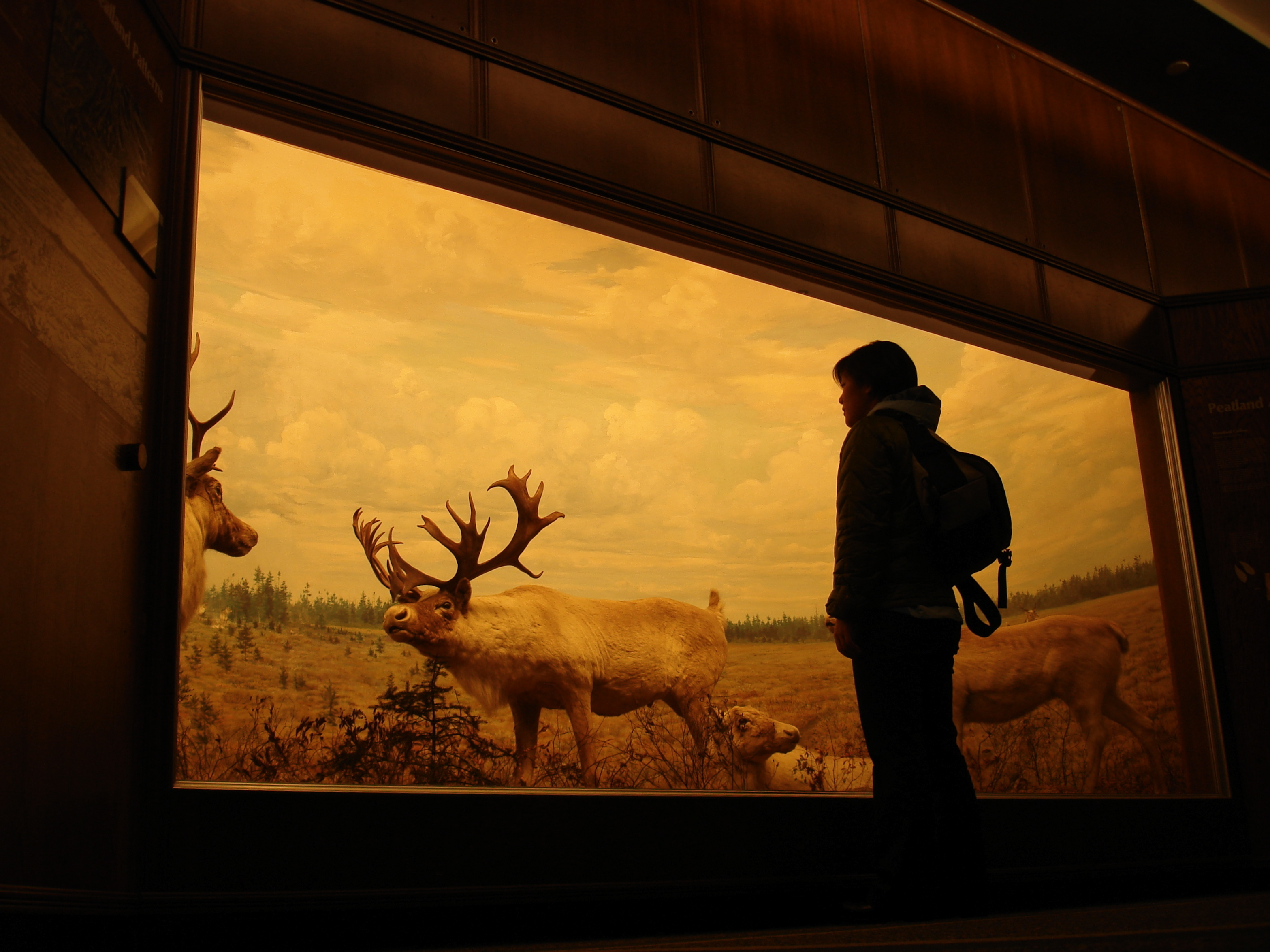
A diorama in the Mammal Collection

Mammal Collection
The majority of the Mammal Collection are standard, dry skin and skull preparations, but the Bell has a reasonably large collection of full skeletons and a growing collection of fluid preserved specimens.

Vascular Plant Collection
The Vascular Plant Collection contains samples of vegetative parts, cones, fruit, and seeds.

== Exhibits ==
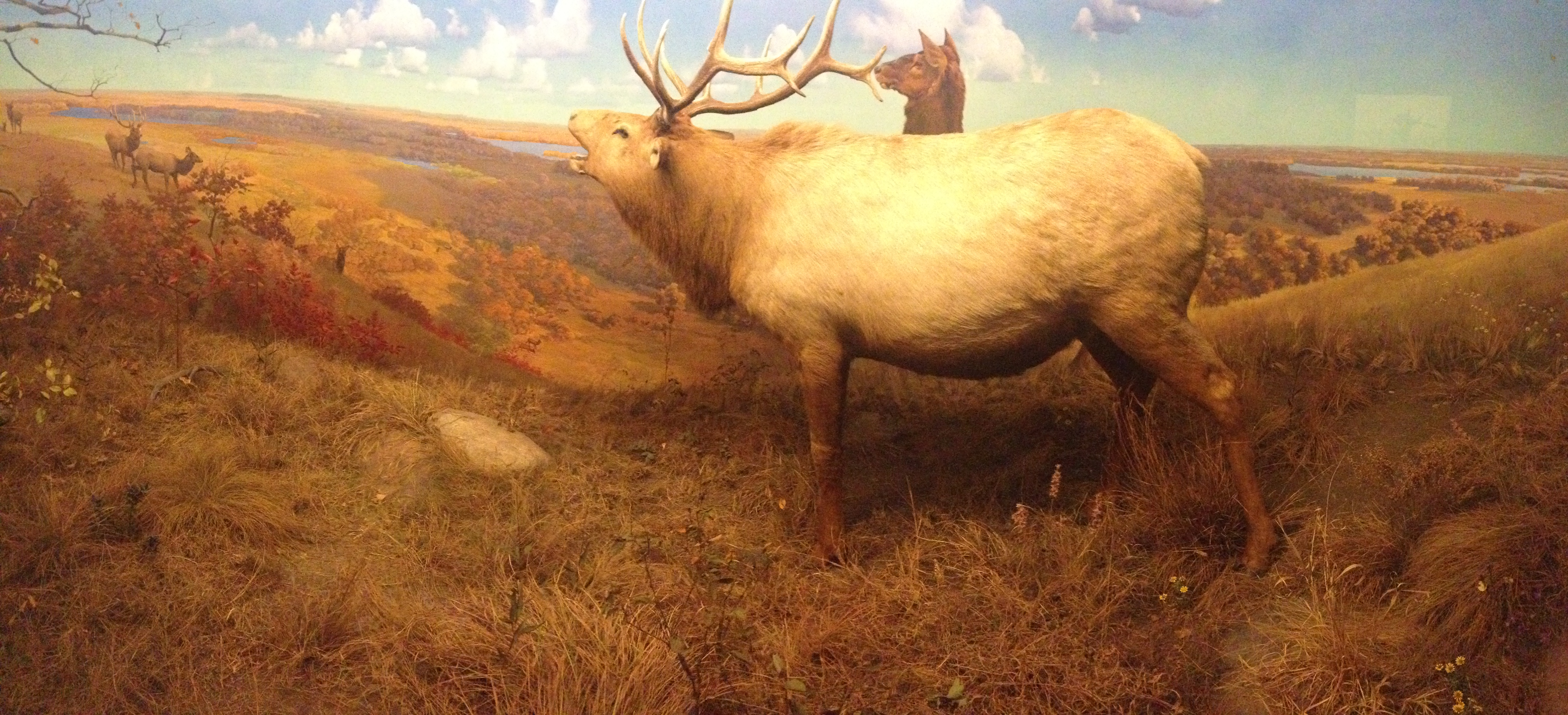
Elk diorama, set at Inspiration Peak northwest of Alexandria, Minnesota

This description refers to exhibits in the museum's former location on 10 Church St.
Dioramas
The Bell Museum's dioramas were located on two floors of the Minneapolis site, and they displayed Minnesota's habitats, along with the birds, animals, plants and insects that populate them. There were moose, elk, bear, beavers, cranes, fish, and more. The dioramas served as an opportunity to learn animal facts, observe animal behavior, and find out how species survive. These dioramas were originally designed between the 1920s and 1940s.

Wildlife artist Francis Lee Jaques completed backgrounds on nine of the large dioramas and ten of the medium-size dioramas.

Touch and See Room
The Touch and See Room was constructed 1968. Public Education Coordinator Richard Barthelemy realized visitors wanted to get their hands on specimen that are traditionally behind glass in museums. Barthelemy started by sitting down with groups and passing around bones, furs, and feathers. He teamed with Dr. Roger Johnson from the University of Minnesota's Department of Curriculum and Instruction in the College of Education to create hands-on programming. Shortly after Touch and See opened, the Smithsonian Institution's National Museum of Natural History in Washington D.C. visited the Bell and then launched their discovery room.

The Touch and See Room today still features bones, furs, and feathers, but it also includes live specimens of snakes, frogs, geckos, cockroaches, and tarantulas.

Rainforest Gallery
“Under the Fig Leaf” is a living rainforest and active research project managed by the museum's Curator of Plants, Professor George Weiblen. Many of the plants were grown from seeds collected by Weiblen in tropical forests around the world like Papua New Guinea. Visitors can get a ground floor and canopy view of the mini rainforest and learn about related University of Minnesota research.

ExploraDome
The ExploraDome is a large, inflatable planetarium dome that travels across the state. Museum staff lead audiences on a virtual voyage from the surface of the Earth to the edge of the known universe in an intimate environment, holding up to 30 people per show. All presentations are given live by a planetarium educator and allow for audience interaction, unless noted as "pre-recorded."

Traveling Exhibits
The Bell Museum of Natural History develops and circulates exhibitions on a broad range of topics. With these exhibitions, the Bell seeks to instill a greater appreciation of our natural world and promote a better understanding of contemporary ecological issues. Although many of the exhibitions are designed for small-to medium-sized spaces, the Bell's exhibits have traveled to museums of all sizes throughout the United States and Canada. Most of the exhibits require gallery installation, but several are self-supporting, lightweight, and easily assembled. These are ideal for bookings in either museum or non-museum settings, such as visitor centers, schools, and libraries.

== Whitney and Elizabeth MacMillan Planetarium ==
The Minnesota Planetarium Society (MNPS) was a Minnesota-based organization for the promotion of an education in astronomy which operated the Minnesota Planetarium from 1960 until it was closed in 2002. When the Minneapolis Central Library was torn down in 2002, the former planetarium was closed with the understanding that it would be rebuilt as part of the new library. In September 2011, the Planetarium Society merged with the University of Minnesota's Bell Museum of Natural History instead. The new building features a digital planetarium that uses INSIGHT Dual Laser 4K projection system.

The planetarium is named after Whitney MacMillan and his wife.

== Programs ==
The museum has a variety of programming and events that caters to a range of age groups. Science labs, summer camps, Spotlight Science, Sensory Friendly Saturdays, After Hours, and Star Parties are several of the offerings that spark an interest and appreciation for science, technology, art, engineering and math. Their large annual programs include Space Fest in February each year and Spotlight Science: Brain Power during Brain Awareness Week each March.

== Admission (beginning June 14, 2023) ==
	Museum	Planetarium	Combo
Adult	$15	$10	$21
Senior	$13	$9	$18
Youth (3-21)	$12	$8	$16
2 and Under	$0	$0	n/a
University of Minnesota Student	$0	$5	$5
