= John Gabriel Stedman =

Dutch-British army officer and writer (1744–1797)

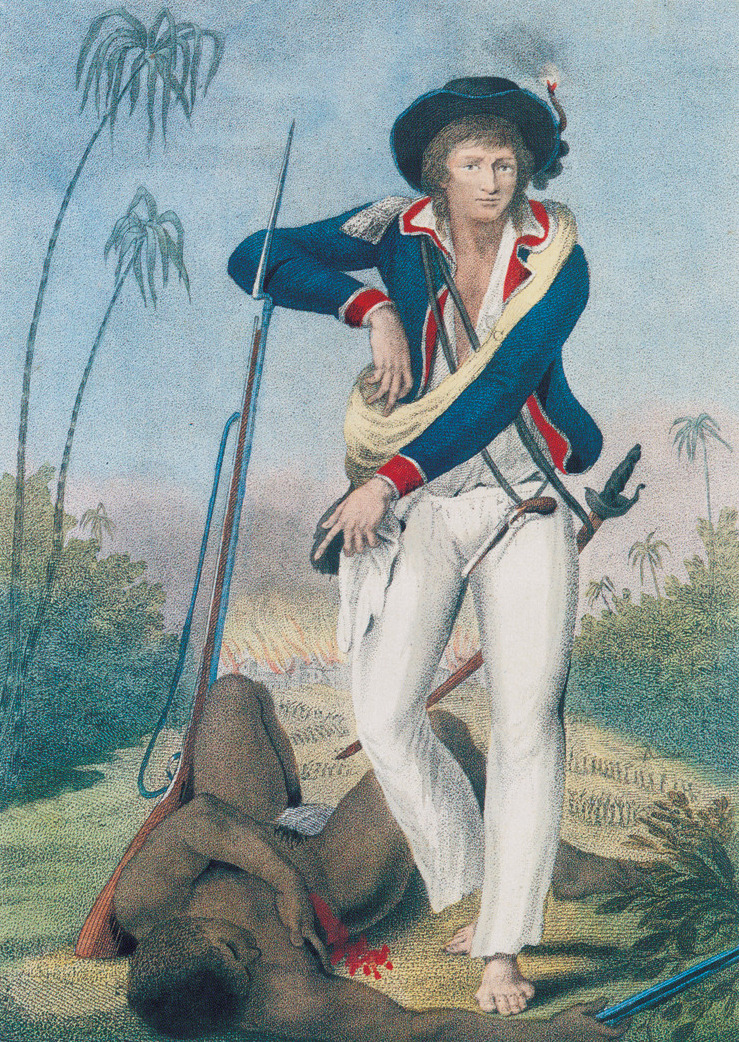
- Portrait of Stedman standing over a maroon after the capture of the Surinamese village of Gado Saby from the frontispiece of his Narrative
- Born: 1744; Dendermonde, Austrian Netherlands
- Died: 7 March 1797 (aged 52–53); Tiverton, Devon
- Occupations: Army officer, author
- Spouse(s): Adriana Wiertz van Coehorn, Joanna
- Children: Johnny, Sophia Charlotte, Maria Joanna, George William, Adrian, and John Cambridge
- Writing career
- Period: 1790s
- Genre: Autobiography adventure
- Notable work: The Narrative of a Five Years Expedition against the Revolted Negroes of Surinam
- Military career
- Allegiance: Dutch Republic; Great Britain
- Branch: Dutch States Army; British Army
- Service years: 1760–1778 (Dutch Republic); 1793–1796 (Great Britain)
- Rank: Captain (Dutch Republic); Lieutenant colonel (Great Britain)
- Units: Scots Brigade; Scotch Brigade

John Gabriel Stedman (1744 – 7 March 1797) was a Dutch-British army officer and writer best known for writing The Narrative of a Five Years Expedition against the Revolted Negroes of Surinam (1796). This narrative covers his experience in Suriname between 1773 and 1777, where he was a soldier in a Dutch regiment deployed to assist colonial troops fighting against groups of maroons. He first recorded his experiences in a personal diary that he later rewrote and expanded into the Narrative. The Narrative was a bestseller of the time and, with its firsthand depictions of slavery and other aspects of colonialism, became an important tool in the fledgling abolitionist movement. When compared with Stedman's personal diary, his published Narrative is a sanitized and romanticized version of Stedman's time in Surinam.

== Early life ==
Stedman was born in 1744 in Dendermonde, then in the Austrian Netherlands, to Robert Stedman, a Scotsman and officer in the Dutch Republic's Scots Brigade, and his Franco-Dutch wife, Antoinetta Christina van Ceulen. He lived most of his childhood in the Dutch Republic with his parents, but also spent time with his uncle in Scotland. Stedman described his childhood as being "chock-full of misadventures and abrasive encounters of every description".

== Military career ==
Stedman's military career began at the age of 16. He was commissioned into the Dutch States Army at the rank of ensign, being stationed at several Barrier fortresses. Stedman was eventually promoted to lieutenant. Though he later left the Dutch army, in 1771 Stedman rejoined it due to being in overwhelming debt after the death of his father. In 1772, responding to a call for volunteers, he joined an expeditionary corps of 800 men which was destined for the Dutch colony of Surinam. The colony was then engaged in a low-intensity conflict with groups of maroons, former slaves who had escaped slavery and established independent communities on the colonial frontier. Promoted to brevet captain, he left for Surinam onboard the Dutch States Navy frigate Zeelust on 24 December 1772.

Upon arriving in the colony, Stedman was placed under the direct command of Colonel Louis-Henri Fourgeoud, the commander of the newly-arrived corps. The relationship between the two men was acrimonious: Fourgeoud often dined on gourmet meats, wine and other delicacies while his troops subsisted on meager and often spoiled rations. He treated Stedman cruelly, inventing tasks for him to complete and taking away his ammunition. Stedman believed that Fourgeoud neglected his duties as an officer, ignoring the well-being of his troops, and only retained his rank through monetary bribes. Regarding Fourgeoud's poor leadership, Stedman was uncompromising: "I solemnly declare to have still omitted many other calamities that we suffered". Stedman's difficulties were compounded by the fact that his corps, which was trained for the battlefields of Europe, was unprepared to fight against the unfamiliar guerrilla tactics of the maroons.

On 10 August 1775, shortly after falling ill, Stedman wrote Fourgeoud a letter requesting both a furlough to regain health and six months' military pay that was owed to him. Fourgeoud refused his request twice, although he granted similar requests to other officers. Stedman later wrote that "This so incensed me that I not only wished him in Hell, but myself also, to have the satisfaction of seeing him burn". In the campaign against the Maroons, Stedman fought alongside the newly-formed Free Negro Corps, which consisted of Black slaves purchased from their enslavers. Soldiers of the unit were promised their freedom, a house with a garden plot and pay in return for fighting against the maroons. The unit originally numbered 116 men, but 190 more were purchased and joined its ranks after the first group displayed courage and perseverance in combat.

Stedman served in seven campaigns in the forests of Surinam, each averaging three months. He only fought in one battle, which took place in 1774 and concluded with the capture of the maroon village of Gado Saby. A portrayal of the battle was included in the frontispiece of Stedman's Narrative, which depicted him standing over a dead maroon in the foreground and Gado Saby burning in the distance. Throughout these campaigns, Dutch troops were frequently ambushed by maroons and tropical diseases spread rapidly, resulting in an enormous loss of troops. These losses were so great that 830 fresh troops were sent from the Dutch Republic in 1775 to supplement the original 800 men. The campaigns were riddled with sickness, anger, fatigue and death. Stedman observed the horrors of battle and the cat-and-mouse antics of both sides that resulted in merely pushing the fighting across Surinam instead of quelling it.

== Surinam ==
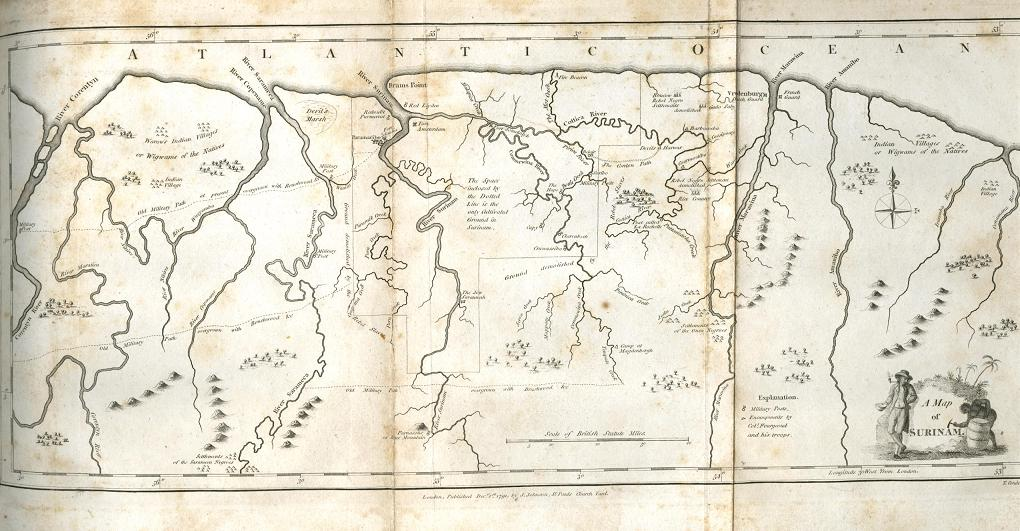
A map of Stedman's Surinam, from the original edition of Stedman's Narrative

Surinam was first colonized by the governor of Barbados in the 1650s, then captured by the Dutch soon after, who quickly began to establish sugar plantations. In 1683 Surinam came under control of the Dutch West India Company. The colony developed an agricultural economy highly dependent on African slavery.

Two rivers were central to the colonies: the Orinoco and the Amazon. At the time of Stedman's deployment, the Portuguese lived along the river Amazon and the Spanish along the river Orinoco. Dutch colonists were spread along the seaside and the French lived in a small settlement known as Cayenne.

== Stedman's Narrative ==
The Narrative of a Five Years Expedition against the Revolted Negroes of Surinam is an autobiographical account of Stedman's experiences in Surinam from the year 1773 through 1777. While Stedman kept a diary of his time in Surinam, which is held by the University of Minnesota Libraries, the Narrative manuscript wasn't composed until ten years after his return to Europe. In the Narrative manuscript, Stedman vividly describes the landscapes of Suriname, paying great attention to flora, fauna, and the social habits of indigenous, free and enslaved Africans, and European colonists in Suriname. His observations of life in the colony encompass the different cultures present at the time: Dutch, Scottish, native, African, Spanish, Portuguese, and French. Stedman also takes time to describe the day-to-day life in the colony.

The first pages of the Narrative record Stedman's voyage to Surinam. He spends his days reading on the deck of the Boreas, attempting to avoid those sick from the turbulent sea. The Boreas was accompanied by another ship the Weftellingwerf and three new frigate built transports. Stedman first arrives in Surinam on 2 February 1773. Upon his arrival in Surinam, Stedman and the troops are met by residents of the fortress Amsterdam, along the Surinam River. Here, Stedman gives his first description of the landscape of Surinam. According to Stedman, the land abounded with delicious smells – lemon, orange, and shaddocks. The natives, dressed in loincloths, were somewhat shocking to Stedman at first, and he described them as "bargemen as naked as when they were born."

Parts of the Narrative continue to focus on descriptions of Surinam's natural environments. Stedman writes that parts of Surinam are mountainous, dry, and barren, but much of the land is ripe and fertile, enjoying a year-long growing season, with rains and a warm climate. He notes that in some parts the land is low and marshy, and crops are grown with a "flooding" method of irrigation similar to that used in ancient Egypt. Stedman also describes Surinam as having large uncultivated areas; there are immense forests, mountains (some with valuable minerals), deep marsh, swamps, and even large savanna areas. Some areas of the coast are inaccessible, with navigational obstructions such as rocks, riverbanks, quicksand, and bogs.

In his Narrative, Stedman writes about the contrast between the beauty of the colony and his first taste of the violence and cruelty endemic there. One of his first observations involves the torture of a nearly naked enslaved woman, chained to an iron weight. His narrative describes the woman receiving 200 lashes and carrying the weight for a month as a result of her inability to fulfill a task to which she was assigned.

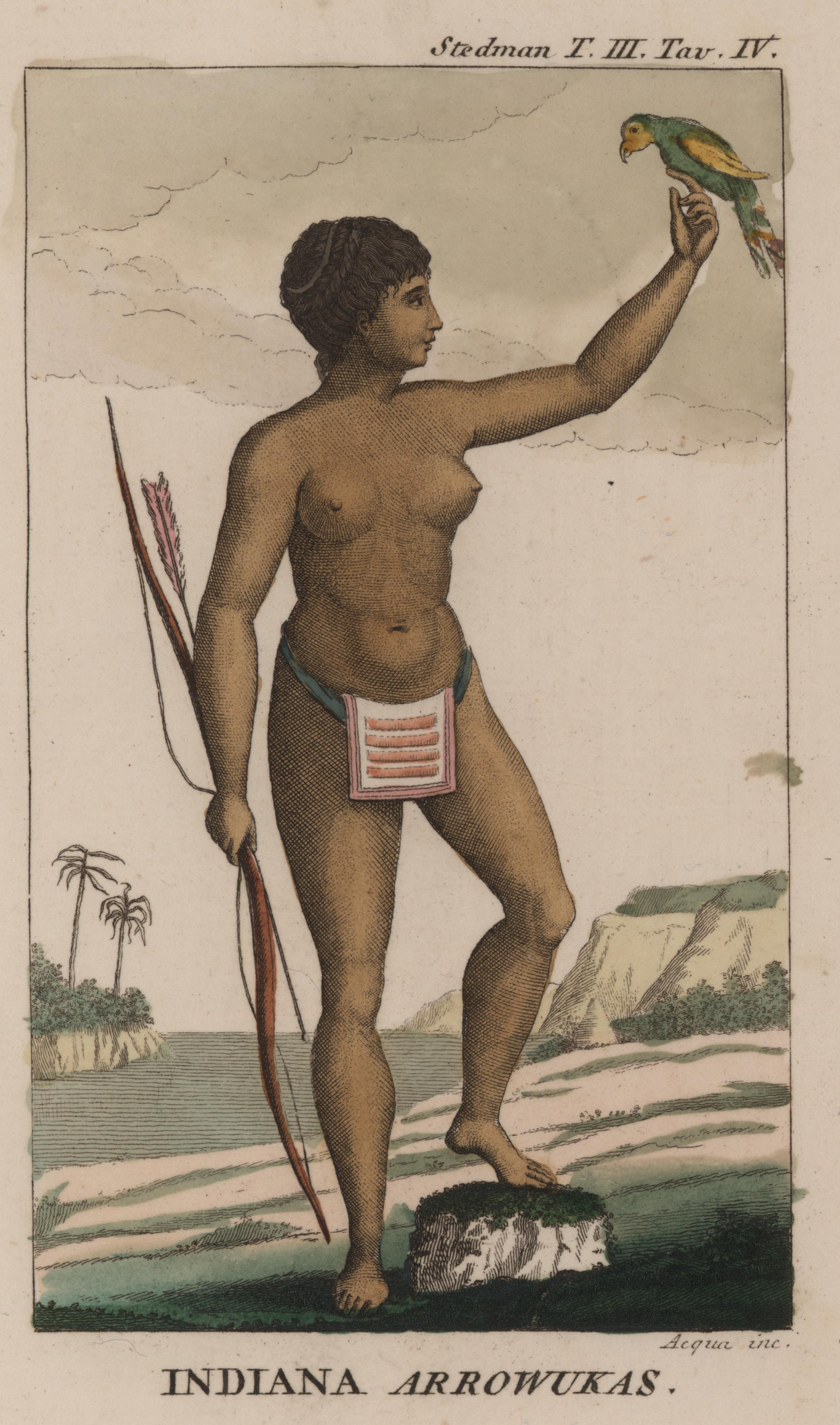
An Arawak woman, wearing a loincloth of woven beads, from Stedman's Narrative.

Over the course of his Narrative, Stedman relays several stories regarding the state of the slaves and the horrors to which they are subjected. In one story detailed in his Narrative, involving a group sailing by boat, an enslaved mother was ordered by her mistress to hand over her crying baby. The mistress then threw the baby into the river, drowning it. The mother jumped into the river after her baby, whose body was recovered by fellow slaves. The mother later received 200 lashes for her defiant behavior. In another story, a small boy shoots himself in the head to escape flogging. In yet another, a man is completely broken on the rack and left for days to suffer until he died.

=== Publication history ===
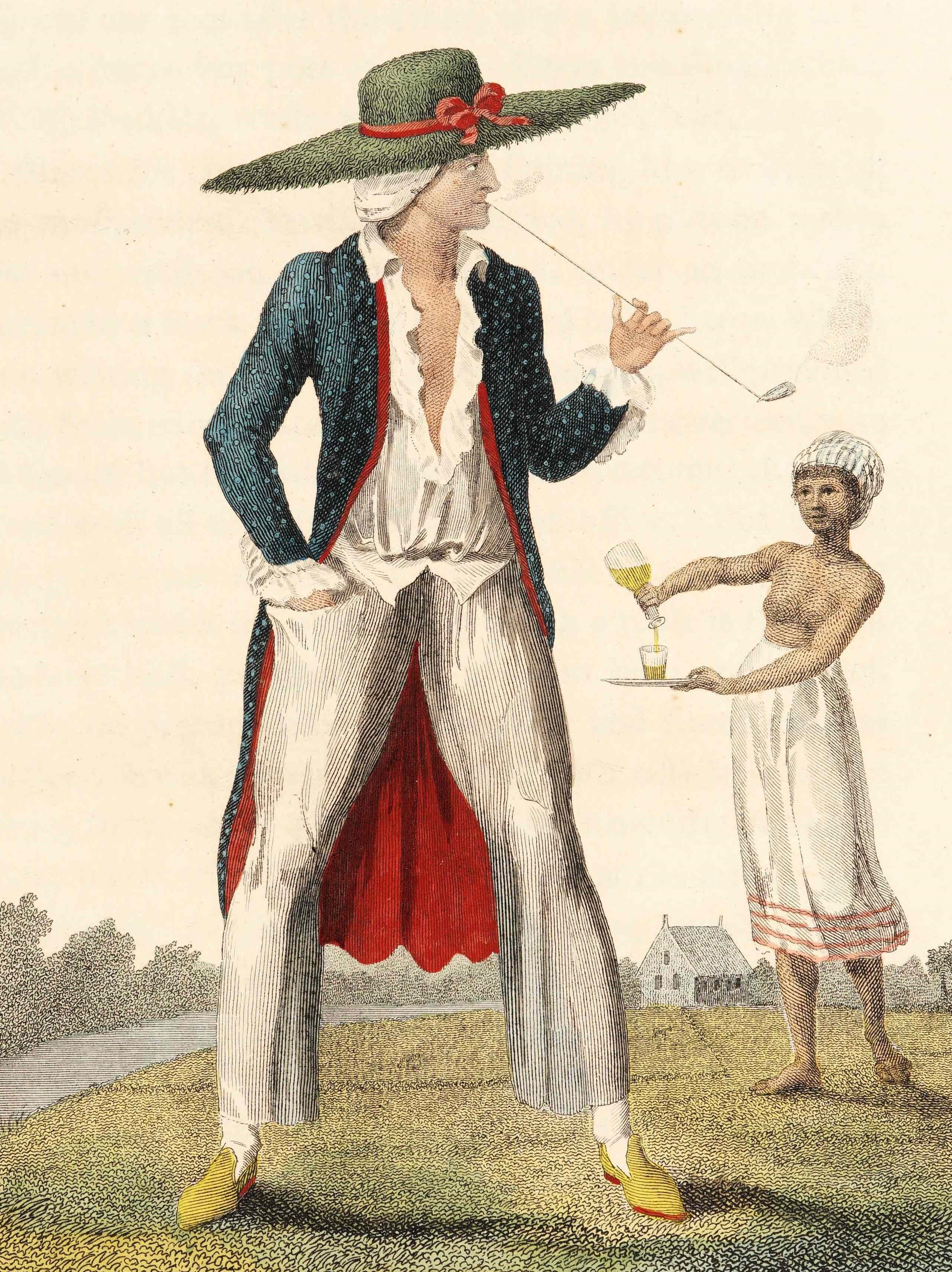
Illustration of a Dutch plantation owner and slave from William Blake's illustrations of the work of Stedman's work first published in 1792-1794

Stedman's Narrative was published by Joseph Johnson, a radical figure who received criticism for the types of books he sold. In the 1790s, more than 50 percent of them were political, including Stedman's Narrative. The books he published supported the rights of slaves, Jews, women, prisoners and other oppressed peoples around the world. Johnson was an active member of the Society for Constitutional Information, an organization attempting to reform Parliament. He was condemned for the support and publication of writers who voiced liberal opinions, such as Mary Wollstonecraft, Benjamin Franklin and Thomas Paine.

Stedman's Narrative became a major literary success. It was translated into French, German, Dutch, Italian, and Swedish, and was eventually published in more than twenty-five different editions, including several abolitionist tracts focused on Joanna. Stedman was highly acclaimed for his insights on the slave trade and his Narrative was embraced by the abolitionist cause. Paradoxically, it also became the handbook for counter-insurgency tactics in the tropics.

It took almost two centuries for a critical edition to be published. The unabridged critical edition, edited by Richard and Sally Price, was published in 1988. An abridged edition published in 1992 by Price and Price remains in print, as well as two editions published in 1962 and 1966 by the renowned antiquarian Stanbury Thompson. Of Thompson's 1962 and 1966 editions, Price and Price write, "Thompson's work confused as much as it elucidated. Examination of the original notebooks and papers that Thompson had used (which are now in the James Ford Bell Library at the University of Minnesota) revealed that, not only had he inserted his own commentary into that of Stedman...but he had changed dates and spellings, misread and incorrectly transcribed a large number of words". A facsimile edition of the 1988 unabridged critical edition of Stedman's original 1790 manuscript, edited by Richard and Sally Price, was published in 2010 by iUniverse and in 2016 by Open Road. This latter edition remains available.

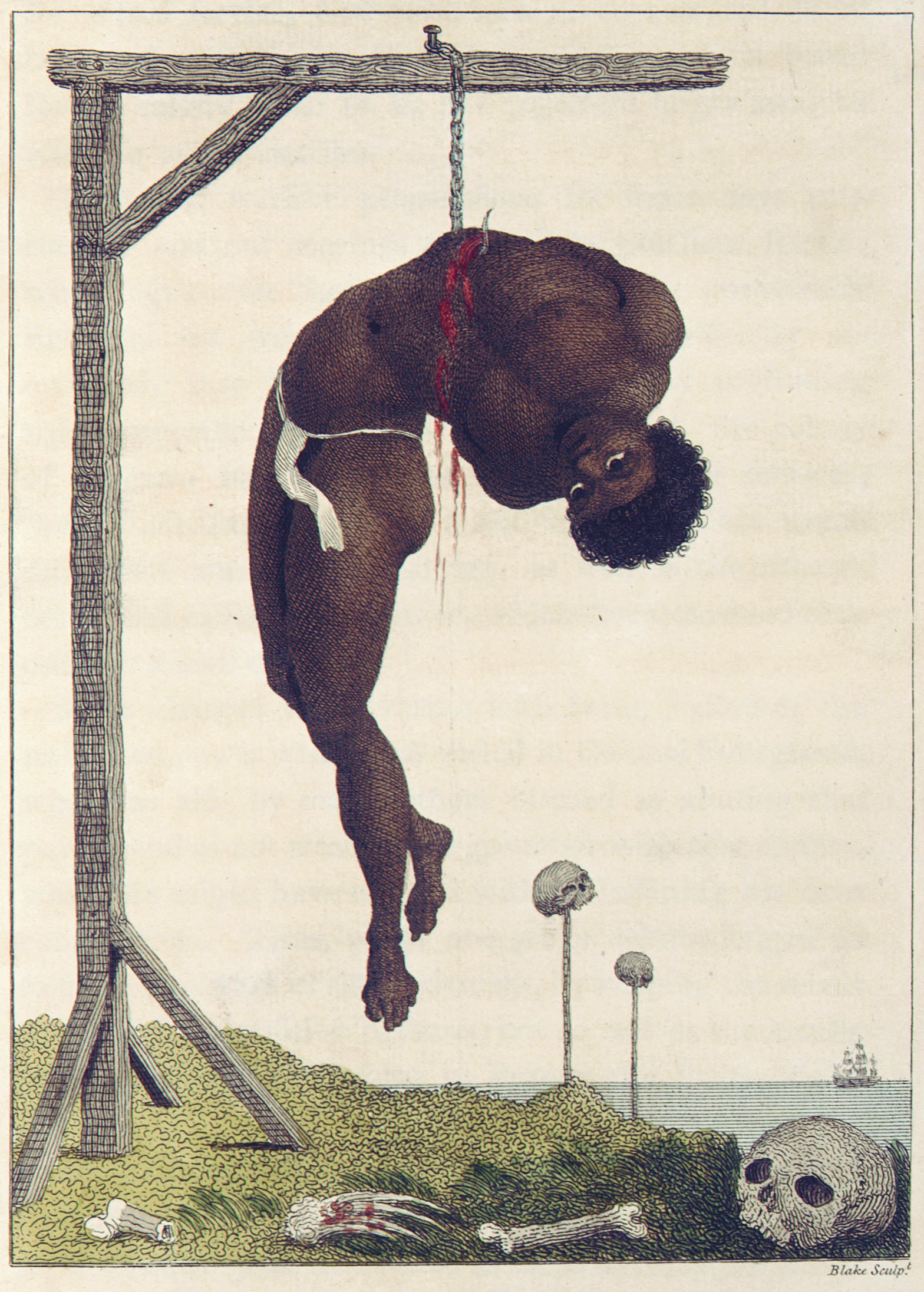
"A Negro Hung Alive by the Ribs to a Gallows," by William Blake, originally published in Stedman's Narrative

=== Blake's illustrations ===
Stedman's Narrative associated him with some of Europe's foremost radicals. His publisher, Johnson, was imprisoned in 1797 for printing the political writings of Gilbert Wakefield. Johnson commissioned William Blake and Francesco Bartolozzi to create engravings for the Narrative. Blake engraved sixteen images for the book and delivered them in December 1792 and 1793, as well as a single plate in 1794. The images depict some of the horrific atrocities against slaves that Stedman witnessed, including hanging, lashing and other forms of torture. The Blake plates are more forceful than other illustrations in the book and have the "fluidity of line" and "hallucinatory quality of his original work". It is impossible to compare Stedman's sketches with the Blake plates because none of Stedman's original drawings have survived. Through their collaboration, Blake and Stedman became close friends. They visited one another often, and Blake later included some of his images from Stedman's Narrative in his poem "Visions of the Daughters of Albion".

=== Stedman the writer ===
As a writer, Stedman was intrigued by Surinam, a "New World" full of complexities that were both familiar and foreign. Torn between the roles of "incurable romantic" and scientific observer, Stedman attempted to maintain an objective distance from this strange new world, but was drawn in by its natural beauty and what he perceived as its exoticness.

Stedman made a daily effort to take notes on the spot, using any material in sight that could be written on, including ammunition cartridges and bleached bone. Stedman later transcribed the notes and strung them together in a small green notebook and ten sheets of paper covered front and back with writing. He intended to use these notes and journals to produce a book. Stedman also made a point to write clearly and distinguish truth from hearsay. He was diligent about facts and focused primarily on firsthand accounts of events.

On 15 June 1778, just a year after returning to the Netherlands from Surinam, Stedman began piecing together these notes and journals into what would ultimately become his Narrative. In 1787, Stedman began showing pieces of his journal to friends in an attempt to secure financial backing for the publication of the manuscript. He also attempted to gain potential subscribers in major cities throughout Europe. On 8 February 1791, Stedman sent the first edition of his newly completed manuscript, along with a list of 76 subscribers, to Johnson.

In 1786, Stedman wrote a series of retrospective journal entries recalling the events of his life up to the age of 28. In this diary, he portrayed himself in the style and tone of such fictional characters as Tom Jones and Roderick Random. He elaborated on his opposition to authority figures, which he also described during his time in Surinam, and on the sympathy he felt towards creatures and humans unnecessarily punished or tortured. In these entries, Stedman tells of occasions throughout his life when he interceded on the behalf of others to alleviate suffering. Stedman insisted that he did not describe the events of his life with the intention of gaining success or fortune. He explained that he wrote "purely following the dictates of nature, & equally hating a made up man and a made up story."

=== Discrepancies between published Narrative and personal diaries ===
Stedman wrote his Narrative ten years after the events took place. The Narrative sometimes deviates from the diary, but Stedman was careful to provide his sources and state firsthand observations as opposed to outside accounts. One of the main differences between the two works involves Stedman's representation of his relationship with Joanna. In the diary, he recounts numerous sexual encounters with enslaved women before he met Joanna, events which were removed from the Narrative. Stedman omitted a series of negotiations between himself and Joanna's mother, during which she offers to sell Joanna to him. Stedman also removes the early sexual encounters from the Narrative, and Joanna is represented as a romantic figure whom Stedman describes with sentimental and flowery language, as opposed to an enslaved girl who served his sexual and domestic needs. Mary Louise Pratt refers to these changes as a "romantic transformation of a particular form of colonial sexual exploitation".

== Stedman and slavery ==
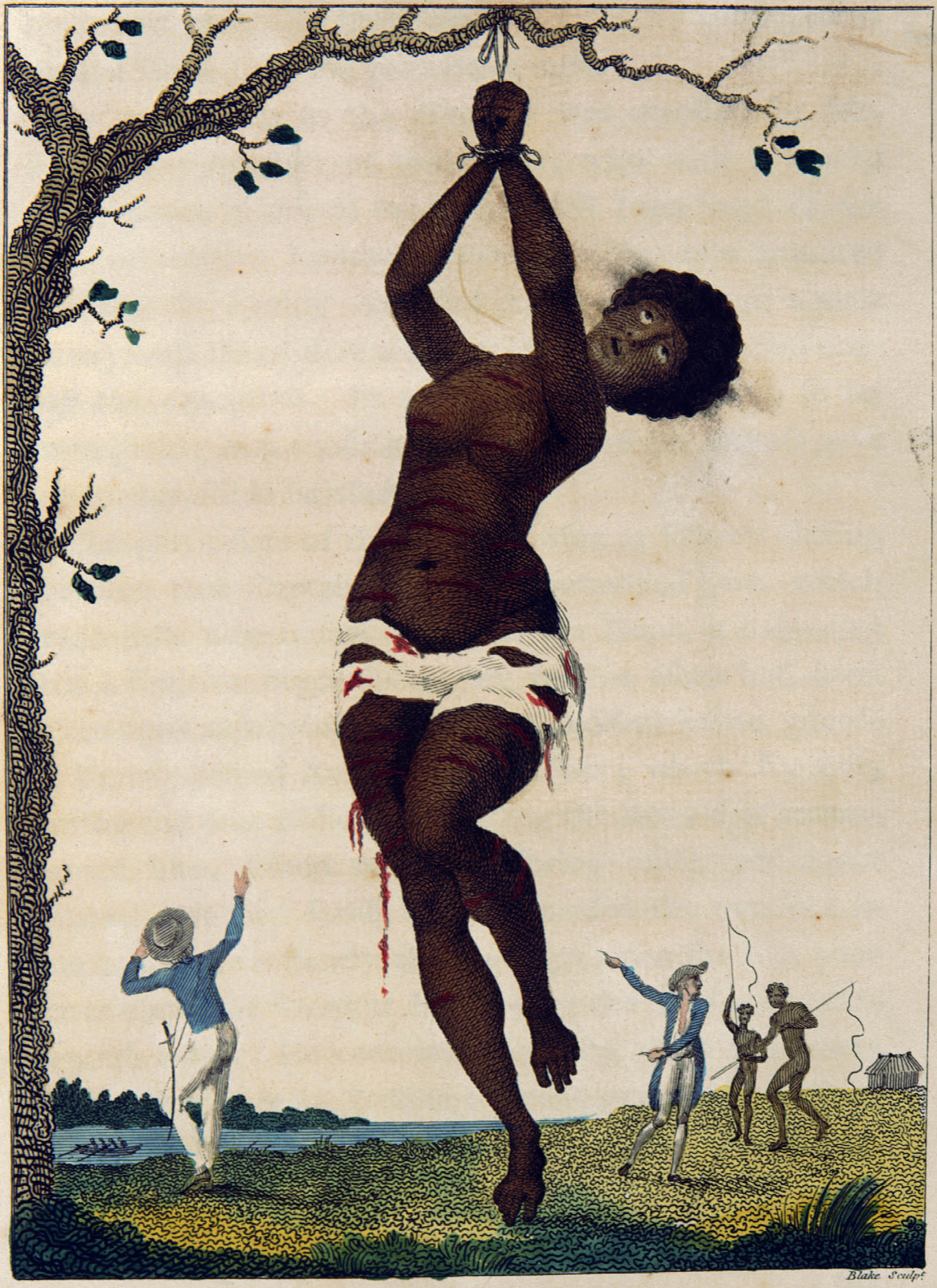
Illustrator William Blake's "Flagellation of a Female Samboe Slave", 1796. Stedman's attitudes toward slavery were complicated, although he witnessed many atrocities committed against slaves firsthand

Stedman's attitude toward slaves and slavery has been the subject of scholarly debate. In spite of the abolitionist utility of the text, Stedman himself was far from an abolitionist. A defense of slavery runs throughout the text, emphasizing problems that would arise from sudden emancipation. In fact, Stedman believed that slavery was necessary in some form to continue allowing European nations to indulge their excessive desires for commodities such as tobacco and sugar. A seemingly pro-slavery attitude is espoused throughout much of his text.

Stedman's relationship with the slave Joanna further complicates his views toward slavery. Given Joanna's status as a enslaved woman and her young age at the time their relationship began, their relationship may be considered a form of "colonial sexual exploitation". Stedman described their relationship as one "of romantic love rather than filial servitude," although Joanna's feelings on the relationship are unknown - as is often the case with women of color who are said to have had consensual relationships with powerful white men, such as La Malinche and Sacagawea.

The Narrative is also an ethnocentric text. Some critics argue that the book made Stedman seem like a much more consistent pro-slavery advocate than he intended. But Stedman's attitudes toward individual slaves did not coincide with his attitude toward the institution of slavery. His sympathy for the suffering slaves, expressed throughout the book, is consistently obfuscated by his opinion about slavery as an institution, which according to Werner Sollors was "complicated, its representation strongly affected by the revisions."

== Sexual encounters ==
According to the editorial introduction to the Narrative, Stedman "larded his autobiographical sketch with amorous adventures." For example, as a young man growing up in Holland, Stedman had concurrent affairs with his landlord's wife and her maid until the landlady became jealous and evicted both Stedman and the maid simultaneously. Stedman details frequent sexual encounters with free and enslaved women of African descent in his travel diary, beginning on 9 February 1773, the night he arrived in Suriname's capital, Paramaribo. 9 February is recounted with the following entry: "Our troops were disembarked at Parramaribo...I get fudled [sic] at a tavern, go to sleep at Mr. Lolkens, who was in the country, I f—k one of his negro maids".

The personal journal that Stedman kept (and the sexual encounters mentioned therein) varies quite a bit from his published Narrative. The image-conscious Stedman, with a wife and children back in Europe, wanted to cultivate the impression of a gentleman rather than the serial adulterer he portrays in his diaries. Stedman's Narrative removes the depersonalized sex with women of color and replaces it with more detail regarding his relationship with Joanna. Price and Price summarize these changes as "While his diaries depicted a society in which depersonalized sex between European men and slave women was pervasive and routine, his 1790 manuscript transformed Suriname into the exotic setting for a deeply romantic and appropriately tragic love affair."

=== Joanna ===
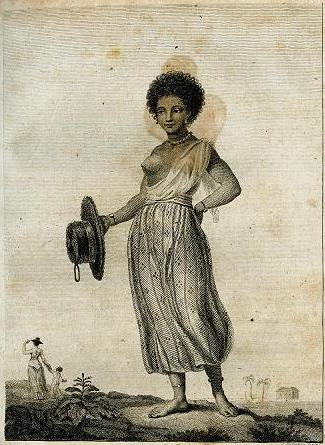
An engraving of Joanna from the original edition of Stedman's Narrative.

Stedman first mentions Joanna by name in his journal on 11 April 1773 in relation to his negotiation with her mother for the purchasing of Joanna's sexual and domestic services: "J—, her Mother, and Q— mother come to a close bargain with me, we put it of for reasons I gave them." Stedman eventually negotiates an arrangement with Joanna's mother, which he indicates in this diary entry: "J—a comes to stay with me. I give her presents to the value of about ten Pound sterling and am perfectly happy." In the 1790 manuscript edition of Stedman's travel narrative, edited and expanded on from his travel diary, he praised the physical appearance of Joanna, "bespeaking the Goodness of her heart".

Throughout the Narrative, Stedman praises Joanna's character. He often describes instances of what he viewed as her loyalty and devotion to him through his absences and illnesses:

"She told me she had heard of my forlorn situation; and if I still entertained for her the same good opinion I had formerly expressed, her only request was that she might be permitted to wait upon me till I recovered. I gratefully accepted the offer; and by her unwearied care and attention, I had the good fortune to regain my health."

In the nineteenth century, abolitionists circulated Stedman and Joanna's story, most notably in Lydia Maria Child's collection The Oasis in 1834. The first abridged edition of Stedman's Narrative to concentrate on Joanna's narrative was published in 1824, titled Joanna, or The Female Slave, a West Indian Tale. The anonymous compiler of the 1824 version writes in the preface that emancipation is "neither practicable or advisable" but advocates for "the abolition of cruelty". In 1838, Isaac Knapp, a Boston abolitionist and printer, published Narrative of Joanna; An Emancipated Slave, of Surinam. Knapp founded the New England Anti-Slavery Society in 1832 along with William Lloyd Garrison. Knapp and Garrison also co-founded the abolitionist newspaper, The Liberator in 1831. Like Lydia Maria Child's version of Stedman and Joanna's narrative included in the abolitionist collection The Oasis in 1834, Narrative of Joanna was circulated in a distinctly American abolitionist discourse.

Stedman and Joanna had a son, named Johnny. Johnny was eventually freed from slavery, but not Joanna. However, when Stedman returned to the Dutch Republic in June 1777, Joanna and their son stayed behind in Surinam. Stedman explained this by saying that Joanna refused to return with him:

"She said, that if I soon returned to Europe, she must either be parted from me forever, or accompany me to a land where the inferiority of her condition must prove a great disadvantage to her benefactor and to herself; and in either of these cases, she should be most miserable."

Shortly after his return to the Dutch Republic, Stedman married a Dutch woman, Adriana Wierts van Coehorn, and started a family with her. According to Stanbury Thompson's edition of Stedman's journals, Joanna died in 1782, after which their son migrated to Europe to live with Stedman and was educated at Blundell's School. Johnny later served as a midshipman in the Royal Navy and died at sea near Jamaica.

=== Stedman's family in Devon ===
Stedman's wife, Adriana, was the wealthy granddaughter of a well-known Dutch engineer. Together they settled in Tiverton, Devonshire, and had five children: Sophia Charlotte, Maria Joanna, George William, Adrian, and John Cambridge. Following the death of Joanna, Johnny joined their household. Adriana made no attempt to hide her feelings of resentment toward Johnny and Stedman often protected his son from her wrath. Stedman favored his first son and later wrote a journal almost entirely devoted to accounts of Johnny's adolescence. After Johnny's death, Stedman published a poem he wrote for his son, eulogizing their relationship. The last lines are as follows:

"Fly gentle shade, fly to that blest abode,
There view thy mother – and adore thy God.
There, O my boy!, on that celestial shore,
O may we gladly meet, and part no more."

Stedman's daughters were married to prosperous men of good families. His other sons joined the military. George William served as a lieutenant in the Royal Navy and died while attempting to board a Spanish ship off the coast of Cuba in 1803. Adrian fought in the First Anglo-Sikh War for which he was later honored after participating in the Battle of Aliwal against the Sikhs, and died at sea in 1849. John Cambridge served as captain of the 34th Light Infantry of the East India Company military and was killed in an attack on Rangoon in 1824.

== Final years and death ==
After of the outbreak of the Fourth Anglo-Dutch War in 1780, the Scots Brigade's officers were ordered by Dutch authorities to take an oath of allegiance to the stadtholder on 18 November 1782. Most, including Stedman, refused and returned to Britain. The returning officers petitioned the British government to reconstitute the unit as a British Army regiment. Their efforts eventually led to the Scotch Brigade being raised in October 1794. Stedman was commissioned as a major in the regiment on 5 July 1793 before it was officially raised, and on 3 May 1796 he was promoted to lieutenant colonel. Despite this, Stedman continued to style himself as 'captain'.

Family tradition maintains that Stedman suffered a severe accident around 1796 which prevented him from commanding the Scotch Brigade at Gibraltar and led to him retiring to Tiverton, Devon. Instructions left by Stedman before his death requested that he be buried in the parish of Bickleigh next to self-styled gypsy king Bampfylde Moore Carew. He asked specifically to be interred at precisely midnight by torchlight. Stedman's final request was apparently not honored in full, as his grave lies in front of the vestry door, on the opposite side of the church from Carew. The Army List continued to print Stedman's name until 1805, when he had been dead for eight years.

== Publications ==
- John Gabriel Stedman (1988). Narrative of a Five Years Expedition against the Revolted Negroes of Surinam: Transcribed for the First Time from the Original 1790 Manuscript. Edited by Richard Price and Sally Price. Johns Hopkins University Press, 1988.
- John Gabriel Stedman (1963). Expedition to Surinam. Being the Narrative of a Five Years Expedition Against the Revolted Negroes of Surinam in Guiana etc. Edited and abridged by Christopher Bryant. Folio Society, 1963.
- John Gabriel Stedman (1962). Journal of John Gabriel Stedman soldier and author. Edited by Stanbury Thompson. London, The Mitre Press, 1962.
- John Gabriel Stedman (1818), Viaggio al Surinam e nell'interno della Guiana ossia relazione di cinque anni di corse e di osservazioni fatte in questo interessante e poco conosciuto paese dal Capitano Stedman. Milano : Dalla tipografia di Giambattista Sonzogno, 1818.
- John Gabriel Stedman (1813), Narrative, of a Five Years' Expedition, Against the Revolted Negroes of Surinam, vol. 1 (2nd corrected ed.), London: J. Johnson & Th. Payne
- John Gabriel Stedman (1813), Narrative, of a Five Years' Expedition, Against the Revolted Negroes of Surinam, vol. 2 (2nd corrected ed.), London: J. Johnson & Th. Payne
- John Gabriel Stedman (1800), Capitain Johan Stedmans dagbok öfwer sina fälttåg i Surinam, jämte beskrifning om detta nybygges inwånare och öfriga märkwärdigheter. : Sammandrag. Stockholm : Tryckt i Kongl. Ordens Boktryckeriet hos Assessoren Johan Pfeiffer, År 1800.
- John Gabriel Stedman (1799–1800), Reize naar Surinamen, en door de binnenste gedeelten van Guiana; / door den Capitain John Gabriël Stedman; Met plaaten en kaarten; Naar het engelsch. Te Amsterdam: By Johannes Allart, 1799–1800.
- John Gabriel Stedman (1799), Voyage à Surinam et dans l'intérieur de la Guiane contenant La Relation de cinq Années de Courses et d'Observations faites dans cette Contrée intéressante et peu connue; avec des Détails sur les Indiens de la Guiane et les Négres, Paris: F. Buisson
- John Gabriel Stedman (1797), Stedmans Nachrichten von Suriname, dem letzten Aufruhr der dortigen Negersclaven und ihrer Bezwingung in den Jahren 1772 bis 1777. Auszugsweise übersetzt von M. C. Sprengel. Halle : In der Rengerschen Buchhandlung, 1797
- John Gabriel Stedman (1796), Narrative of a five years' expedition against the Revolted Negroes of Surinam in Guiana, on the wild coast of South America from the year 1772 to 1777, elucidating the history of that country and describing its productions. Quadrupedes, Birds, Fishes, Reptiles, Trees, Shrubs, Fruits and Roots; with an account of the Indians of Guiana and negroes of Guinea., London: J. Johnson and J. Edwards
- John Gabriel Stedman The Study of Astronomy, adapted to the capacities of youth
