= A. Hunter Dupree =

American historian (1921–2019)

- Born: Anderson Hunter Dupree; January 29, 1921
- Died: November 30, 2019 (aged 98)
- Education: Oberlin College (BA); Harvard University (PhD)
- Occupation: Historian
- Spouse: Marguerite Louise (Betty) Arnold (m. 1946)
- Children: 2
- Parent(s): George W. Dupree; Sarah Hunter
- Awards: George Sarton Medal (1990)

Anderson Hunter Dupree (January 29, 1921 – November 30, 2019) was an American historian and one of the pioneer historians of the history of science and technology in the United States. He died in November 2019 at the age of 98.

== Early education ==
The son of a lawyer, George W. Dupree, and his wife, Sarah Hunter, he attended Oberlin College, where he earned his Bachelor of Arts degree (summa cum laude) in 1942. Upon completion of his undergraduate work, he served the United States Navy from 1942 to 1946, and became a Lieutenant in the U.S. Naval Reserve.

At the end of World War II, Dupree married Marguerite Louise (Betty) Arnold (c. 1918-May 27, 2014) of Seattle on July 18, 1946, having two children including the historian Marguerite Dupree and the harpsichord maker Anderson H. Dupree.

Hunter Dupree entered Harvard University, where he completed his master's degree in 1947, and his Ph.D. in 1952, having written his doctoral dissertation on Asa Gray, titled "Asa Gray: The Development of a Statesman of Science, 1810–1848". Marguerite earned a Ph.D. in history from Harvard and also taught at universities.

== Academic career ==
In 1950, Dupree took up his first academic position as assistant professor of history at Texas Technological College (now Texas Tech University) in Lubbock, Texas, where he remained until 1952, when he was appointed a research fellow at the Gray Herbarium at Harvard University. He served two appointments there in 1952–54 and 1955–56. In addition, he served as project director on grants at the National Science Foundation, 1953–55.

In 1956, the University of California, Berkeley appointed Dupree as visiting assistant professor of history, then promoted to associate professor in 1958, and professor of history in 1961. He served additionally as assistant to the chancellor in 1960–62, and director of the Bancroft Library in 1965–66. In addition, Dupree was a consultant to the committee on science and public policy at the National Academy of Sciences in 1963–64. He remained at Berkeley until 1968.

Despite being a competent academic, Dupree's tenure in the Bancroft Library directorship was brief and stormy. He was appointed to the directorship in June 1965 but clashed repeatedly with the staff over library internal policy, which sparked a near-revolution among its employees. Part of the disagreement involved Dupree's emphasis on modernizing traditional library practices and the way collections, particularly manuscripts, were handled in the collections. He also required an accounting for long-term projects on which the library devoted resources but could show few actual results. In January 1966 The UC-Berkeley president returned him to the history faculty that same June.

In 1968, Brown University appointed Dupree George L. Littlefield Professor of History, a position he held until his retirement in 1981. While in this post, he served as a consultant to the Panel on Science and Technology and Astronautics, U.S. House of Representatives, 1969–73; trustee of the American Textile History Museum, a member of the NASA Historical Advisory Committee, and the Atomic Energy Commission's Historical Advisory Committee.

== Awards ==
- In 1976, he received the Presidential Award of the New York Academy of Sciences and was selected as a Fellow, Center for Advanced Studies, National Humanities Center in 1978–79.
- In 1990, he was awarded the George Sarton Medal.

== Published works ==
- 'Some Letters from Charles Darwin to Jeffries Wyman', Isis Vol.42, Part 2., No.128. (June, 1951), pp. 104–110.
- 'Thomas Nuttall's Controversy With Asa Gray', Rhodora, Vol. 54, (1952), pp. 293–303.
- 'Science vs. the Military: Dr. James Morrow and the Perry Expedition', The Pacific Historical Review, vol. 22, no. 1, (1953), pp. 29–37.
- 'Jeffries Wyman's views on evolution', Isis, vol. 44 (1953), pp. 243–246.
- Science in the Federal Government, a history of policies and activities to 1940. (1957, 1986).
- Asa Gray, 1810-1888 (1959, 1968, 1988).
- "What manuscripts the historian wants saved", Isis, vol. 53 (1962), pp. 63–66.
- Darwiniana; essays and reviews pertaining to Darwinism by Asa Gray; edited A. Hunter Dupree. (1963)
- Science and the emergence of modern America, 1865-1916, edited by A. Hunter Dupree. (1963)
- Some general implications of the research of the Harvard University Program on Technology and Society edited by Emmanuel G. Mesthene. Comment: the anticipation of change by Simon Ramo. Comment: Is technology predictable? by Peter F. Drucker. Comment: the role of technology in society and the need for historical perspective by A. Hunter Dupree. Comment on the comments by Emmanuel G. Mesthene. (1969)
- "The crisis in authority", Brown Alumni Monthly, vol. 70, no. 1, (1969)
- Science and society: past, present, and future edited by Nicholas H. Steneck with a contribution by A. Hunter Dupree (1975)
- Sir Joseph Banks and the origins of science policy. James Ford Bell Lecture; no. 22. (1984).

== Manuscript collections ==
- Oberlin College Library RG 30/417: A. Hunter Dupree Family Papers, 1830-2002
- Brown University Library: Anderson Hunter Dupree Papers.
