= Minnesota Planetarium Society =

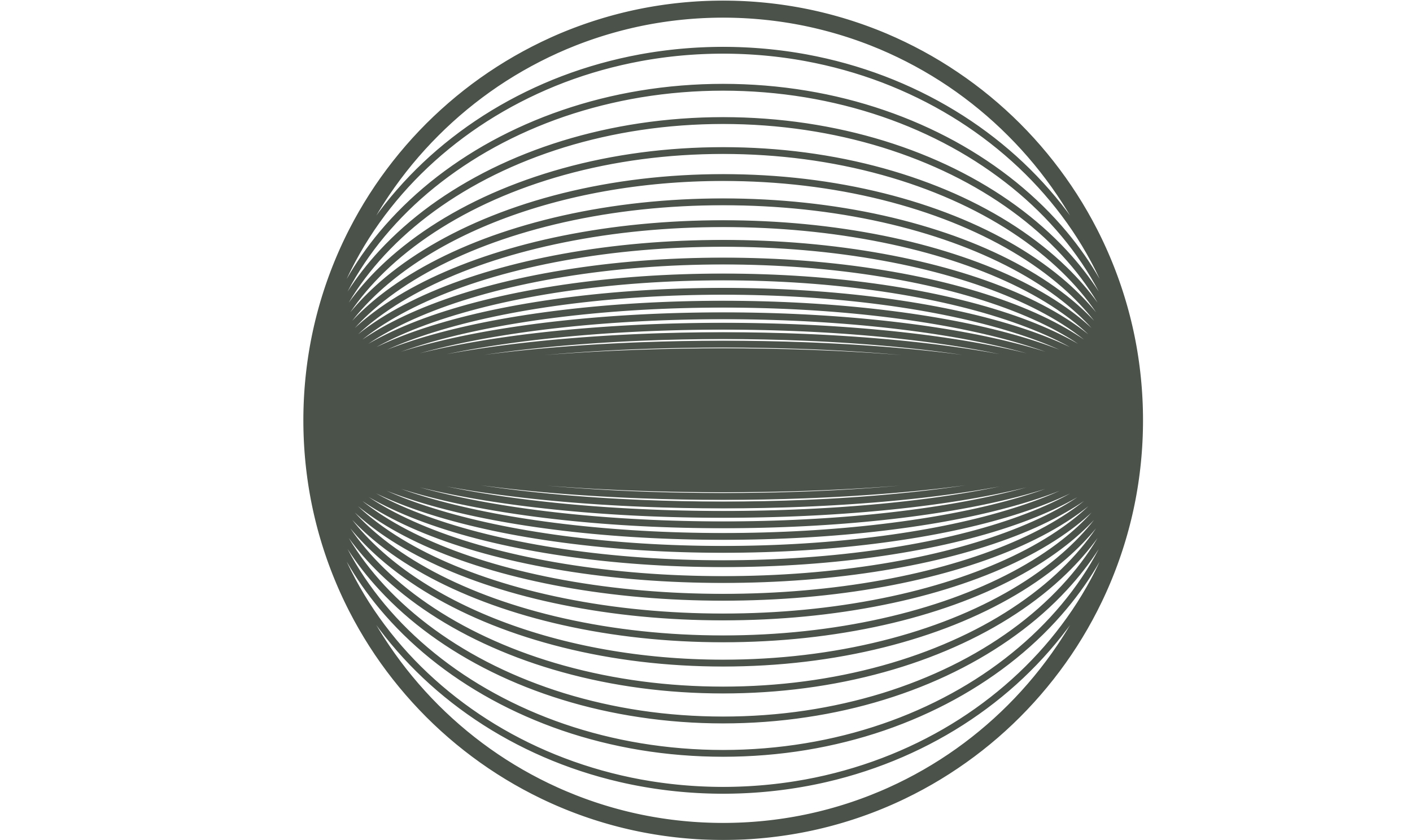
- Established: 2003
- Dissolved: 2011
- Location: Minneapolis, Minnesota
- Coordinates: 44.980134°N 93.270085°W
- Type: Planetarium
- Director: Angus Vaughan

The Minnesota Planetarium Society (MNPS) was a Minnesota-based organization for the promotion of and education in astronomy. In September 2011, it was absorbed by the Bell Museum of Natural History and the society no longer exists.

The Minnesota Planetarium operated from 1960 until it was closed in 2002. Government funding for a new planetarium was cancelled in 2011.

== History ==
In 1889 the Minnesota Academy of Science was granted space in the Minneapolis Public Library for a science museum. When the Academy disbanded in 1929, the Library assumed responsibility for the science museum in a partnership that has evolved and endured for almost 80 years.

In 1960, the City of Minneapolis built a new central downtown library and, to honor its partnership with science, a planetarium was included within it, the only library outside of Alexandria, Egypt, to contain such a feature. 170,000 visitors came to see the night skies during the early years after opening. From 1974 to 1982, the Minneapolis Library had an agreement with the Science Museum of Minnesota to jointly run the planetarium. The Friends of the Minneapolis Public Library agreed to take over its funding and management in 1982. The Minneapolis Planetarium was shuttered when the central library was torn down in 2002 to make way for the new Cesar Pelli-designed facility that would be funded largely through a city referendum. Plans called for a new planetarium with surrounding exhibit space to be built as the library’s fifth and sixth floors. Financing for construction of this project was to come through bonds authorized by the State of Minnesota. From the opening to the closing of the old planetarium, over 4 million Minnesota visitors took advantaged of the facility and its star-shows programs. Even in its last years, with no new capital investment or equipment since its inception, no marketing and no formal school contracts, the planetarium had 70,000 visitors per year.

When the Minneapolis Central Library was torn down in 2002, the former planetarium was shuttered with the understanding that it would be rebuilt as part of the new library. In September 2011, the Planetarium Society merged with the University of Minnesota's Bell Museum of Natural History.

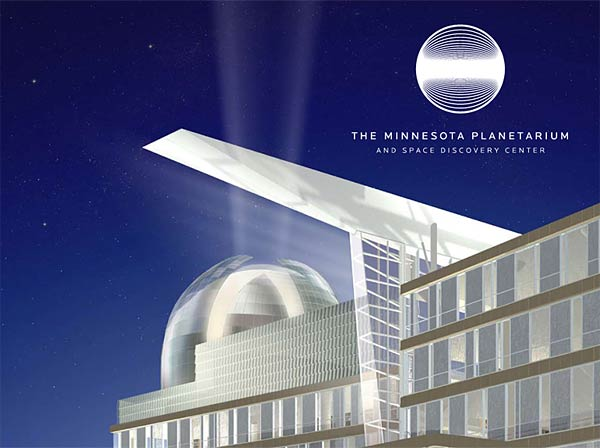
Photo of exterior proposed dome.

=== ExploraDome ===
To provide programming to a state without a public planetarium, the Minnesota Planetarium Society in the fall of 2006 purchased a portable planetarium that could be set up in a school gymnasium or similar space. It provides presentations similar to those previously only displayed in large planetariums such as the Hayden Planetarium in New York City. The system utilizes Uniview software and was designed by Swedish academics at Linköping University and the company SCISS along with scientists at the American Museum of Natural History. The software uses digital images. Visitors can see representation of the sky not just as seen from the Earth but from space. The planetarium can project images of Earth as it would be seen from space. rs see Earth as never before, watching the changes on its surface from yesterday or from billions of years ago. This immersive imagery is projected into a GeoDome Theater using an OmniFocus fish-eye-lens, a system developed by The Elumenati. The Uniview software allows visualization from any point in time or space to put projected onto the dome.

The Minnesota Planetarium Society was the first organization to purchase the package. It named the dome “The ExploraDome” and the program it was to field “the ExploraDome Immersive Learning Program.”

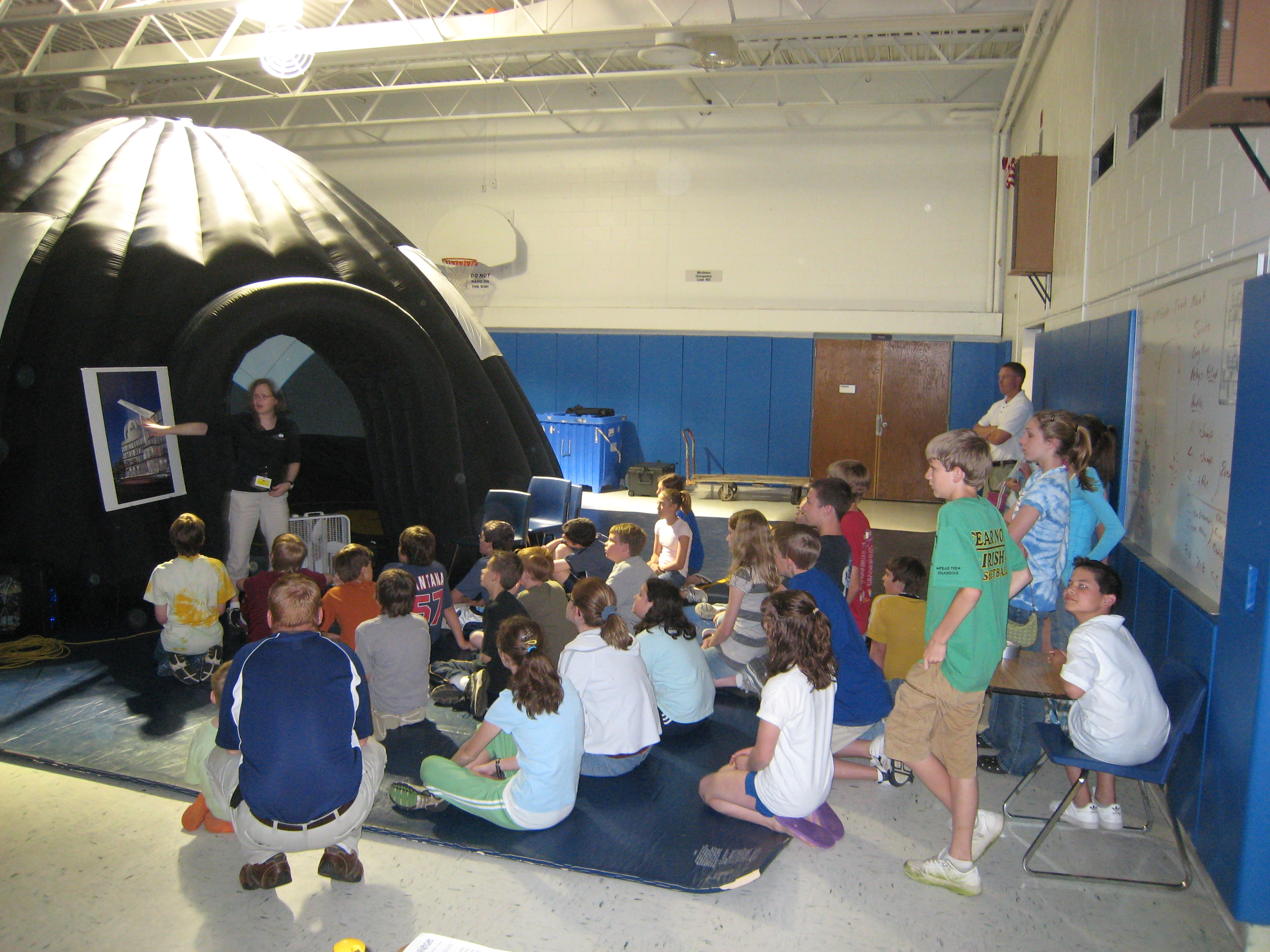
Photo of ExploraDome presentation in a school.

=== Funding ===
- 2002: The Minnesota Legislature agreed to Phase 1 funding for the Minnesota Planetarium and Space Discovery Center at the level of $9.5 million. Governor Jesse Ventura vetoed over 300 million dollars for capital bonding projects - including $9.5 million for the Planetarium.
- 2004: The Minnesota Planetarium Society submitted a $24.1 million funding request for a Minnesota Planetarium & Space Discovery Center to be built in the new Minneapolis Public Library building. The planetarium didn't make it onto Governor Tim Pawlenty's list of capital bonding projects.
- 2005: The Minnesota Legislature granted $22 million in funding via a bonding bill. The new Planetarium was intended to be built on the 5th floor of the new Minneapolis Public Library building.
- 2011: During the July special "Government Shutdown" session of the Minnesota Legislature, the bonding authorization of $22 million for the Minnesota Planetarium was cancelled. During the 2011 legislative session, the House Capital Investment Committee looked closely to de-fund projects bonded in previous years, but had yet to start construction. The intent was to free up money for projects that are ready to go. In this bill, several projects were marked for defunding, including the Minnesota Planetarium, which was approved at $22 million in 2005. On the morning of July 14, 2011, Governor Mark Dayton announced that he would reluctantly sign the budget proposed by the Republican legislative leadership.
