= Minneapolis Central Library =

Public library in Minneapolis, Minnesota, U.S.

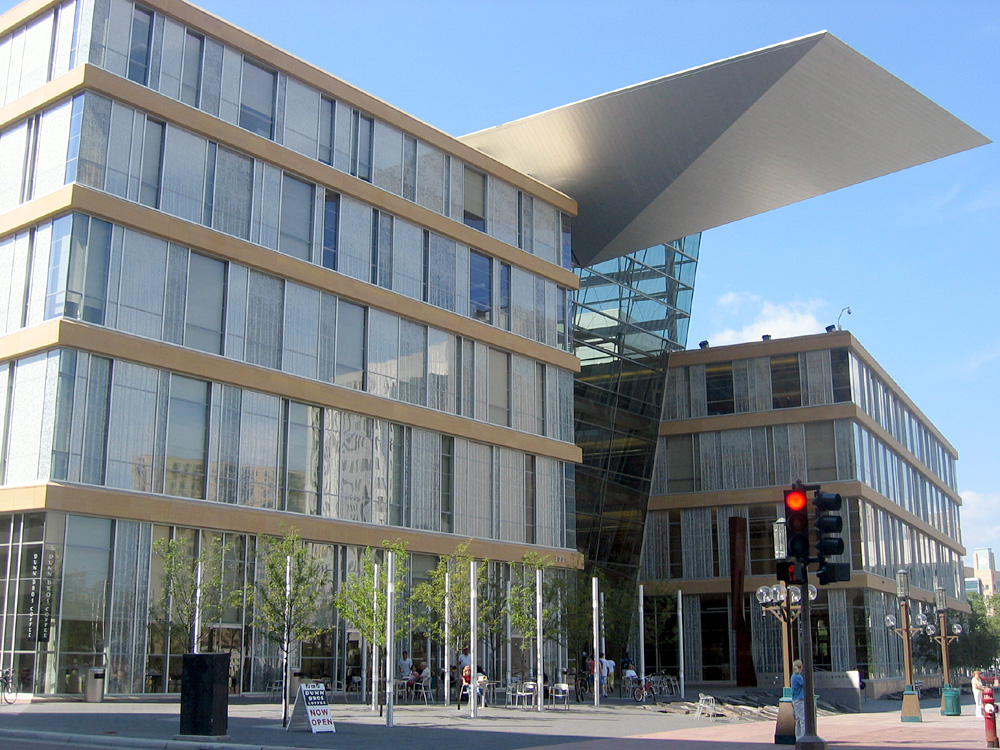
- Minneapolis Central Library in 2006
- 44.9806°N 93.2701°W
- Location: 300 Nicollet Mall, Minneapolis, Minnesota, U.S. 55401
- Type: Public library
- Established: 1885; 141 years ago
- Architect: César Pelli
- Branch of: Hennepin County Library

Other information
- Website: www.hclib.org

The Minneapolis Central Library is a public library located in downtown Minneapolis, Minnesota, United States. It is the largest library in the Hennepin County Library system. It bills itself as having "the third largest per capita public library collection of any major city in America with a collection of more than 2.4 million items—including books, DVDs, music, government documents." The 353,000-square-foot (32,800 m^{2}) building at 300 Nicollet Mall with two levels of underground parking was designed by César Pelli and opened on May 20, 2006. It has over 300 computers for use by the public, an 8,140-square-foot (756 m^{2}) atrium, an 18,560-square-foot (1,724 m^{2}) green roof planted with low-growing ground cover designed to "be sun- and drought-resistant", and a host of energy-efficiency measures.

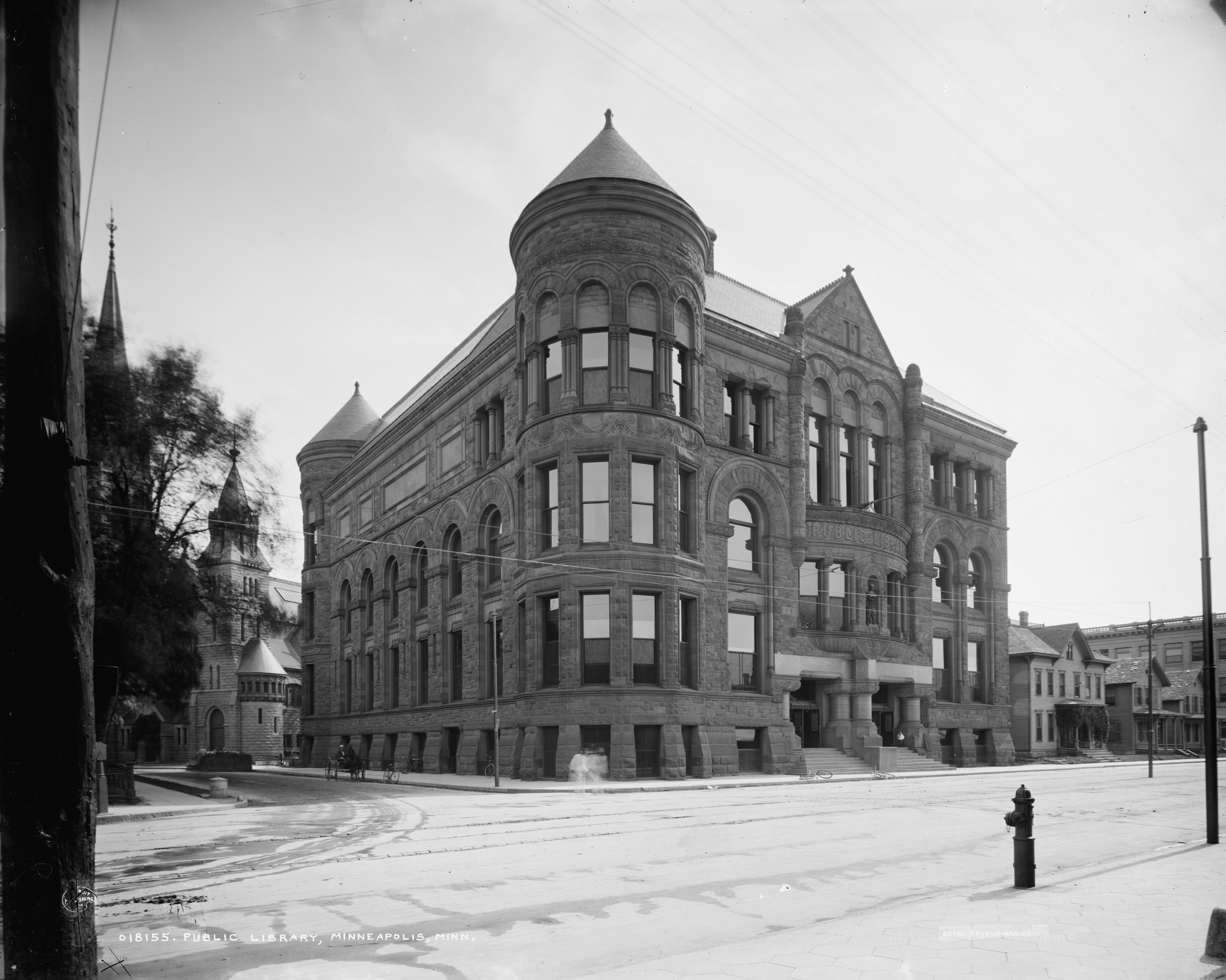
A photograph from around 1900 of the first central Minneapolis Public Library, which cost $324,894.

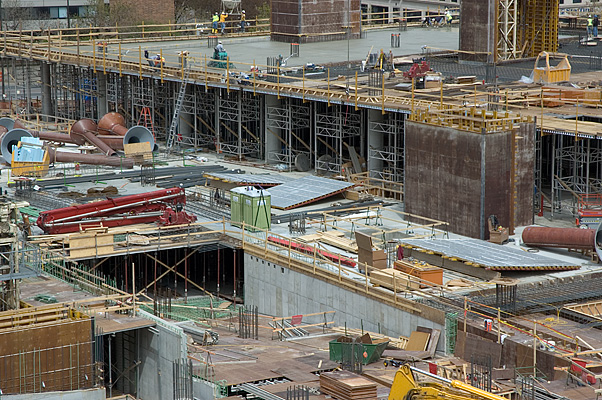
The new Central Library under construction in 2004

== History ==
=== Background ===
The predecessor of Minneapolis's public library was a subscription library called the Minneapolis Athenæum founded in 1859. The Minneapolis Public Library was founded in 1885 and its first task was to build a main library. The first central library of the "Minneapolis Public Library" (also known as the main library) was built in 1889 along Tenth Street and Hennepin Avenue about six blocks south of the current building. The library contained an art gallery primarily of work from the collection of library benefactor T. B. Walker.

=== Second library ===
The second central Minneapolis Public Library building opened in 1961 as part of urban renewal for downtown Minneapolis

After many decades the library was considered overcrowded and out of date and plans began for a new library at a different location. Minneapolis undertook an urban renewal project in 1958, which razed 20 blocks of downtown, demolished 200 buildings, and displaced 3,000 residents, many of which were working class, queer, or sex workers. The new library would be built across from the demolished Onyx Bar, a gay bar central to the Minneapolis LGBTQ+ scene. The Minneapolis Public Library and Information Center (MPLIC), opened on January 28, 1961 at 4th St. and Nicollet Ave. (the site of the current building). The new four-story glass-and-steel building replaced the old stone castle-like one, which was torn down (the space is now a parking lot). The building included a library, as well as a planetarium, auditorium, and a small museum in its basement which became famous for its Egyptian mummies. The new location in the then run-down "lower loop” or Gateway District made the library a "cornerstone" of the 1960 redevelopment of downtown Minneapolis.

=== Current library ===
Thirty years later library and community leaders again began to build support for a new, bigger library. Construction on the third and current library began (on the same location as the demolished second building) after Minneapolis voters approved a $140 million in funding to improve library services on November 7, 2000. The new building was designed by César Pelli, along with the Minneapolis firm Architectural Alliance, and opened to the public on May 20, 2006. At a cost of $250 per square foot, the library features a roof garden and substantial daylight. Its storage area was designed to be available to the public without staff assistance so that nearly all of the collection is accessible to the public. Between the closing of the second library and the opening of the new building, most services were provided at the interim "Central Library Marquette" location, on two floors in Marquette Plaza (formerly the Federal Reserve Bank of Minneapolis). The cost of providing the interim site while the old library was demolished and rebuilt exceeded $10 million.

The Minneapolis Public Library system, which consisted of 14 branch libraries in addition to Central, joined the 26-library Hennepin County Library system on January 1, 2008. The administration for the unified library system remained at Ridgedale Library in Minnetonka.

The Minneapolis Planetarium Society in the second MPLIC building used a projector machine created before the space age (delivered and installed originally in 1954, three years before the launch of Sputnik I). In 2005, the Minnesota Legislature apportioned funding for the inclusion of a planetarium in the new Central Library building. The 37,000-square-foot (3,400 m^{2}) Minnesota Planetarium was originally planned for the roof of the new building but was instead added to the plans for the new Bell Museum of Natural History at the University of Minnesota.

== Design ==
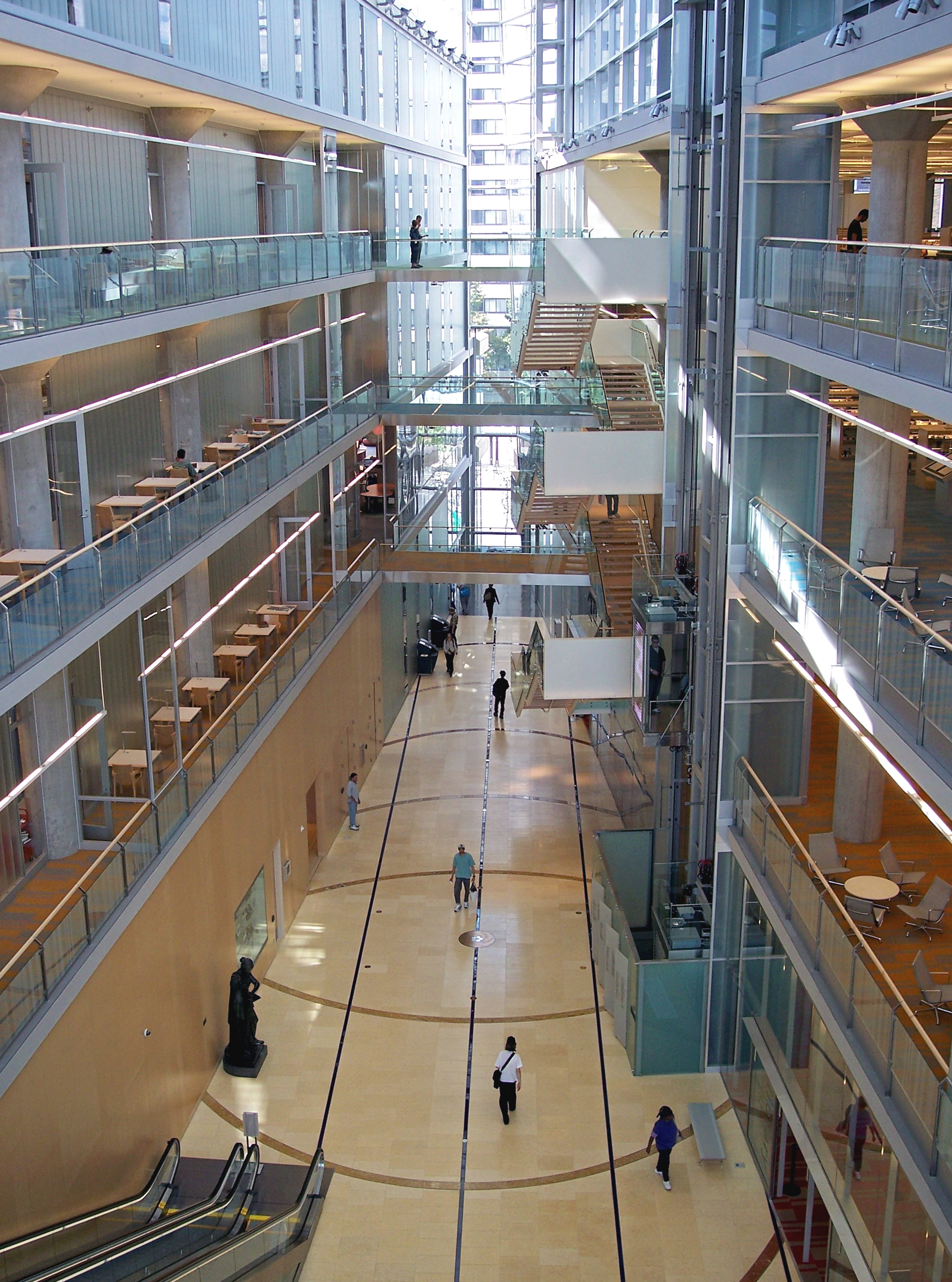
The atrium of the Central Library

The 353,000-square-foot (32,800 m^{2}) building at 300 Nicollet Mall with two levels of underground parking was designed by César Pelli and opened on May 20, 2006. It has over 300 computers for use by the public, an 8,140-square-foot (756 m^{2}) atrium, an 18,560-square-foot (1,724 m^{2}) green roof planted with low-growing ground cover designed to "be sun- and drought-resistant", and a host of energy-efficiency measures.

== See also ==
- List of Hennepin County Library branches
