= Nils William Olsson =

Swedish American diplomat, historian and genealogist

Nils William Olsson (1 June 1909 Seattle, Washington – 20 March 2007 Winter Park, Florida) was a Swedish American diplomat and academic who authored significant works about Swedish emigration to the United States.

== Early life ==
Olsson was the first child born to Nils Albin Olsson and Mathilda Lindström. After his mother’s death in 1913, the family left Washington and returned to Sweden where his father married Elsa Viktoria Larsson. The family returned to the United States in 1922 and settled in Sharon, Pennsylvania.

Olsson graduated from North Park College in 1934. He remained in Chicago and in 1937 began work as an academic at North Park College, then in 1939 as an assistant in Scandinavian at the University of Chicago.

== Family ==
Olsson married Dagmar Theodora Gavert on June 15, 1940 in Cook County, Illinois. Their children included daughter Karna (1942) and twin sons Greg and Chris (1947).

== Career ==
Olsson enlisted in the United States Navy shortly after the attack on Pearl Harbor. He received a commission and served as the assistant naval attaché for the U.S. Legation in Stockholm, Sweden from 1943-1945.

After the war he returned to the University of Chicago and earned his Ph.D. in 1949. In 1949 he received a post-doctoral grant for research. After returning from Sweden, Olsson joined the United States Information Agency in 1950. He was assigned as a cultural affairs officer at the American Legation Reykjavik, Iceland. In 1953 he was posted as a Foreign Service Officer at the American Embassy in Stockholm, Sweden, where he served four years as Attaché and Public Affairs Officer and then as first secretary and consul. In 1957 Olsson was reassigned to the State Department in Washington, D.C. In 1962, he was assigned as first secretary and counselor for political affairs at the American Embassy in Oslo, Norway. In 1966 he returned to the U.S. and became a diplomat in residence at Indiana University in Bloomington, Indiana until his retirement a year later.

In 1967 Olsson became the executive director of the American Swedish Institute in Minneapolis, Minnesota. In 1973 he helped organize the Swedish Council of America, and served as its first executive secretary from 1973 until 1984.

== History and Genealogy ==
Olsson was a founder of the Swedish Pioneer Historical Society (now the Swedish-American Historical Society) in Chicago in 1950, an outgrowth of his previous work in 1947 on the Swedish Pioneer Centennial.

Olsson wrote numerous articles, monographs, and other academic papers, dealing mostly with Swedish immigration and genealogy. After twenty years of research, his work, Swedish Passenger Arrivals in New York, 1820-1850, was published by the Royal Library in Stockholm in 1967. This was followed in 1979 by a volume coauthored with Erik Wikén. Both works were edited and expanded into a single reference published in 1995.

Olsson launched a new quarterly magazine Swedish American Genealogist in 1981. He continued to edit SAG until he retired in 1997.

== Death ==
Nils William and Dagmar Olsson retired to Winter Park, Florida in 1991. He died there in 2007, his wife died there in 2008.

== Published works ==
- Olsson, Nils William and Erik Wikén (1995). Swedish Passenger Arrivals in the United States, 1820-1850. Stockholm: Kungliga Biblioteket.
- Olsson, Nils William (1979). Swedish passenger arrivals in U.S. ports 1820-1850 (except New York).
- Olsson, Nils William (1967). Swedish passenger arrivals in New York, 1820-1850.

== Recognition ==
- 1968 Honorary doctorate from Uppsala University
- 1969 “Swedish-American of the Year” by the Vasa Order of America.
- 1994 Victor Örnberg Memorial Prize by the Swedish Federation of Genealogical Societies.
