= James Ford Bell Library =

Special collection of the University of Minnesota Libraries

Coordinates: 44°58′15″N 93°14′37″W

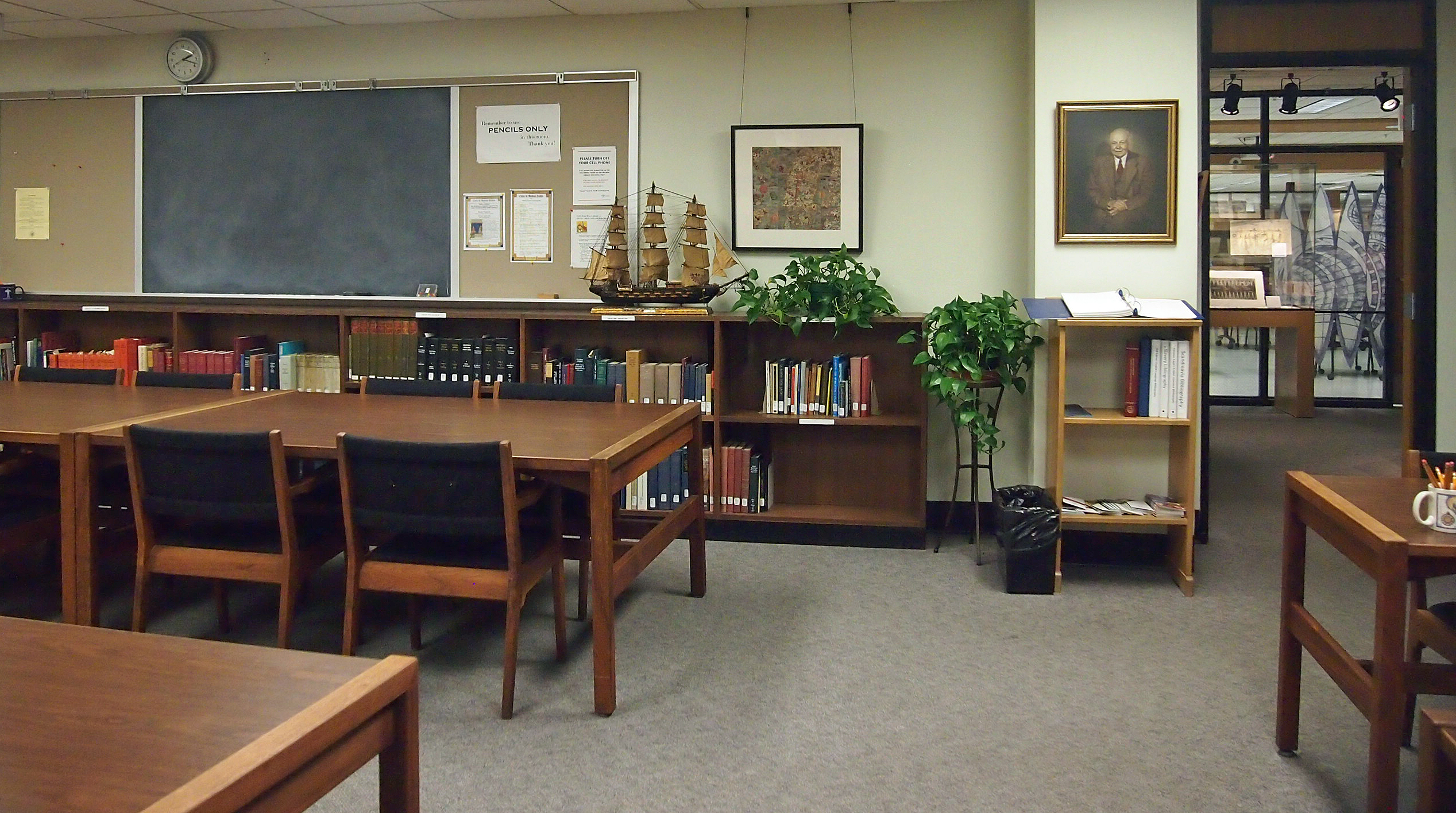
A reading room at the James Ford Bell Library when it was still located in the Wilson Library building.

The James Ford Bell Library is a special collection of the University of Minnesota Libraries located on the University of Minnesota Minneapolis campus. It is named for its first donor and patron James Ford Bell, founder of the General Mills Corporation in Minneapolis, Minnesota. The collection consists of some 40,000 rare books, maps, manuscripts, broadsides, pamphlets and other materials documenting the history and impact of international trade and cultural exchange in the pre-modern era, before ca. 1800. Its materials range in date from 400 CE to 1825 CE, with the bulk of the collection concentrated between the years 1450 and 1790, the early modern period. The library is known for its globe gores copy of the 1507 Waldseemuller world map, and it acquired a copy of the 1602 Impossible Black Tulip Chinese world map in 2009. The scope of the collection is global and more than 15 languages are represented.

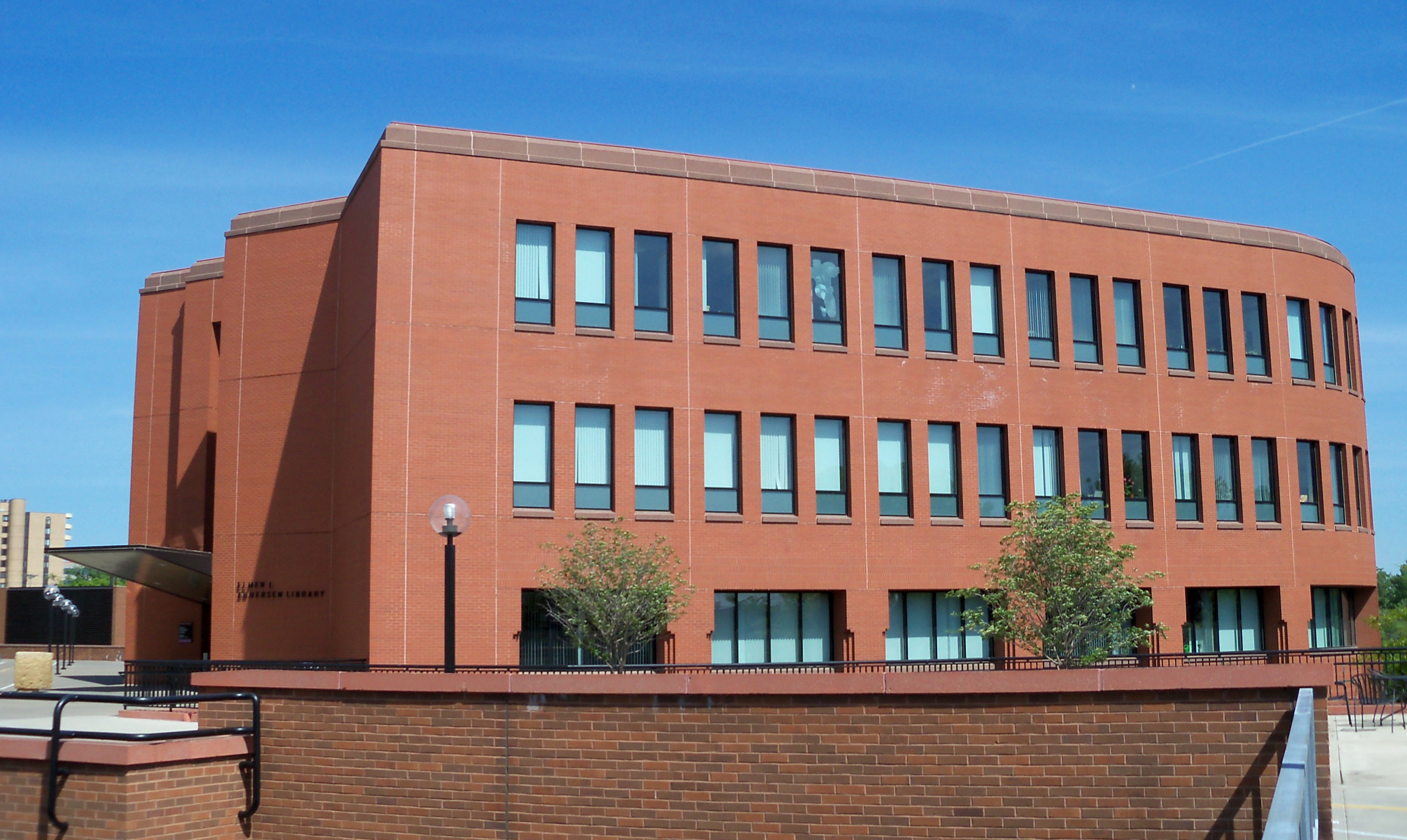
Elmer L. Andersen Library at the University of Minnesota

The library was founded at the University of Minnesota in 1953 and was located first in Walter Library. It moved to the newly constructed Wilson Library in 1968. In March 2018, the Bell moved again to its current location in the university's Elmer L. Andersen Library building.

The Associates of the James Ford Bell Library was established in 1963 as friends group that contributes to the support of the library and sponsors events and publications. The library has a variety of publications and since 1964 has sponsored an annual public lecture series: the James Ford Bell Lecture.

== Curators ==
- Dr. John "Jack" Parker, 1953–1991
- Dr. Carol Urness, 1991–2001
- Dr. Brian Fryckenberg, 2003
- Dr. Marguerite Ragnow, 2005–present
