= James Ford Bell =

American businessman (1879–1961)

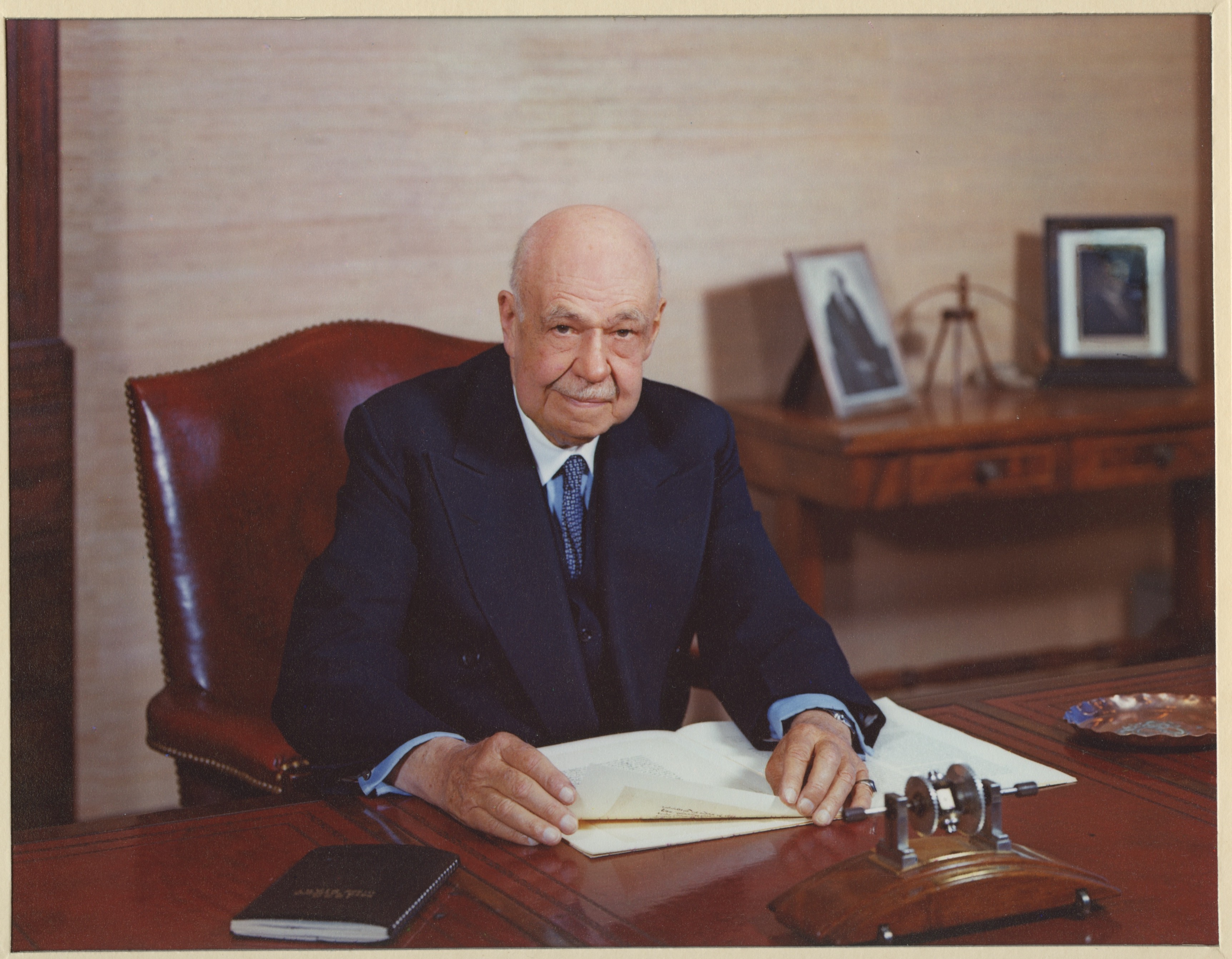
- Portrait
- Born: August 16, 1879; Philadelphia, Pennsylvania, U.S.
- Died: May 7, 1961 (aged 81)
- Education: University of Minnesota
- Occupations: Business leader, Philanthropist
- Organization: Delta Waterfowl Foundation
- Known for: Founder of General Mills
- Notable work: Introduction of Wheaties cereal
- Title: President of General Mills (1928-1934)
- Term: Chairman of General Mills (1934-1948)
- Board member of: AT&T, Eastman Kodak
- Awards: Belgian Order of the Crown, French Legion of Honor

James Ford Bell (August 16, 1879 – May 7, 1961), was an American business leader and philanthropist, was the founder of General Mills in 1928. He served as president of General Mills from 1928 to 1934 and as chairman from 1934 to 1948. He remained a board member until his death in 1961.

== Biography ==
A Quaker, Bell was born in Philadelphia, Pennsylvania, and moved with his family to Minneapolis, Minnesota, in 1888. During World War I he was appointed by the Food and Drug Administration as chairman of the Milling Division. In 1918 he assisted Herbert Hoover's European Hunger Relief Mission and was awarded the Belgian Order of the Crown and membership in the French Legion of Honor. Bell served on the board of AT&T for 24 years and also served on the board of Eastman Kodak. He was a trustee of the Carnegie Institution of Washington, DC, and was a longtime trustee of the Minneapolis Institute of Arts. His collection of Georgian silver is a major part of that museum's decorative arts collections. His collection of rare books devoted to the history of early modern trade comprises the basis for the James Ford Bell Library at the University of Minnesota. A highlight of the collection is Mateo Ricci's massive world map (1602), the oldest surviving map in Chinese to show the Americas. Bell was a graduate of the University of Minnesota (Class of 1901) and served as a regent of the university for 21 years. Bell's red-roofed mansion, Belford, still stands high on a hill overlooking Lake Minnetonka. Built by his father, James Stroud Bell, in 1906, the house's name is an amalgam of his parents' names (James Stroud Bell and Sally Montgomery Ford).

Bell was a dedicated conservationist. In 1938, he provided half the funding for a new natural history museum at the University of Minnesota, working with his friend, and fellow Quaker, Dr. Thomas Sadler Roberts, a physician, who had also served as director of the museum. In 1966, the museum was named for him, becoming the James Ford Bell Museum of Natural History, known today as the Bell Museum.

A lifelong hunter, Bell was very interested in waterfowl biology and the importance of habitat in supporting healthy populations of ducks, geese and other marshland species. He collaborated with Aldo Leopold on his desire to create an organization dedicated to better understanding of waterfowl biology. Leopold recommended one of his graduate students, H. Albert Hochbaum, to lead the research effort. Bell was the founder of the Delta Waterfowl Foundation, which continues to support research into waterfowl biology.

== General Mills ==
Bell founded General Mills in 1928 to consolidate many regional grain milling concerns and was instrumental in the company's move into the breakfast cereal business with the introduction of Wheaties. The company's research campus is named The James Ford Bell Technical Center, in his honor.
