= The Dogs and the Wolves =

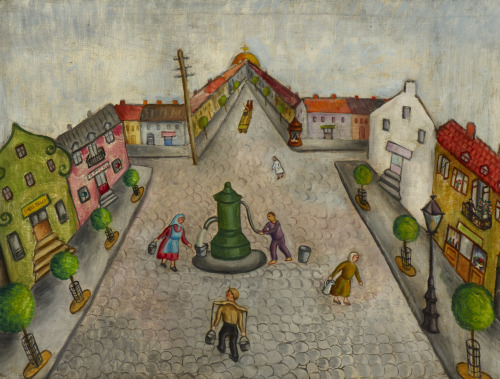
- Chana Kowalska, Shtetl (1934). In her novel The Dogs and the Wolves, Irène Némirovsky gets closer to the Jewish people.
- Author: Irène Némirovsky
- Genre: Novel
- Publisher: Éditions Albin Michel
- Publication date: 1940
- Publication place: France
- Pages: 342

Les Chiens et les Loups (The Dogs and the Wolves) is a novel by Irène Némirovsky (1903–1942), published at the end of 1939 as a serial in the weekly magazine Gringoire, and then in book form by Éditions Albin Michel in 1940. Overshadowed by the Phoney War, it was the last work by Némirovsky to be published in volume under her own name during her lifetime, before she was banned from the profession and deported to Auschwitz, where she died after one month.

The story follows the characters from Kiev to Paris, from the beginning of the 20th century to the interwar period. The plot is essentially a combination of two threads: the passionate love of the heroine Ada Sinner, a painter married to her cousin Ben, for the rich and distant Harry; and Harry's rediscovery, through her painting, of the Jewish community to which he belongs.

The title refers to the two male protagonists and, beyond that, to two opposing characters: the "dogs" who, like Harry, wait for destiny to be fulfilled, and the "wolves" who, like Ben, confront it, even provoke it. Ada appears to be a double of the author, embodying her relationship to artistic creation. Finally, through the misfortunes of two Jewish families who fled an anti-Semitic Russia, the novel depicts exile and the desire to integrate, as well as to find one's roots. It allows Némirovsky to express her questions about the Jewish people, about social success and assimilation, as well as about her own Jewishness.

The Dogs and the Wolves is not free of the stereotypes about Jews which the author is often accused of. It does, however, offer a masterpiece counterpoised against those who would like to see her as an antisemitic Jewish novelist: this story expresses more than others her compassion for the Jewish people, and betrays her growing doubts about the protection to be expected from her adopted country. As such, it confirms a turning point in Némirovsky's career as well as in her inner self.

== Summary ==
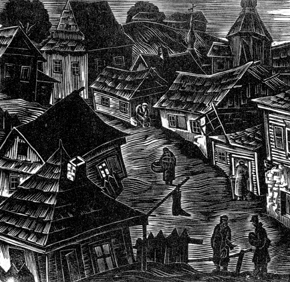
Solomon Yudovin, Vitebsk (engraving from 1926). A shtetl in Russia.

In a Ukrainian ghetto, during the reign of Tsar Nicholas II, little Ada Sinner lives with her father Israel, a widowed stockbroker, her maternal grandfather, her aunt Rhaïssa, her cousin Lilla and her cousin Ben. The latter already loves her with a kind of fury. One day, Ada sees young Harry Sinner in the garden of her rich hillside villa and can't stop thinking about him. She is eight years old when a pogrom breaks out. After hiding all night, Ada and Ben flee to the upper town and find refuge with their distant banker relatives: Harry is horrified by their story and especially by their miserable appearance. Several successful negotiations allow Israel to leave the shtetl, and Ada takes up painting. Mrs. Mimi, an old Parisian woman who teaches French, introduces him to Harry at an Alliance française party. The boy, although aware and even confused that he is mortifying her, refuses to dance with Ada, as she represents to him a dreadful world of poverty, opposed to his own and yet obscurely linked to it. In May 1914, Rhaïssa and Mrs. Mimi decide to leave for Paris with the children.

The First World War and the Russian Revolution deprived them of the subsidies sent by Israel. Rhaïssa becomes a seamstress and Lilla dances in a music hall. One morning, Ada delivers a dress in the street where Harry lives, whose family has also emigrated, with all his belongings: recognizing him from afar, she loses the money for the order. Chased away by her aunt, she then agrees to marry Ben, who exults and hopes that she will end up loving him. Harry is in love with the beautiful Laurence Delarcher, but she has to overcome the antisemitic preconceptions of her banker father. Two years later, while Lilla ties her fate to a rich foreigner, Ada takes a kind of masochistic pleasure in prowling under the windows of Harry, now engaged.

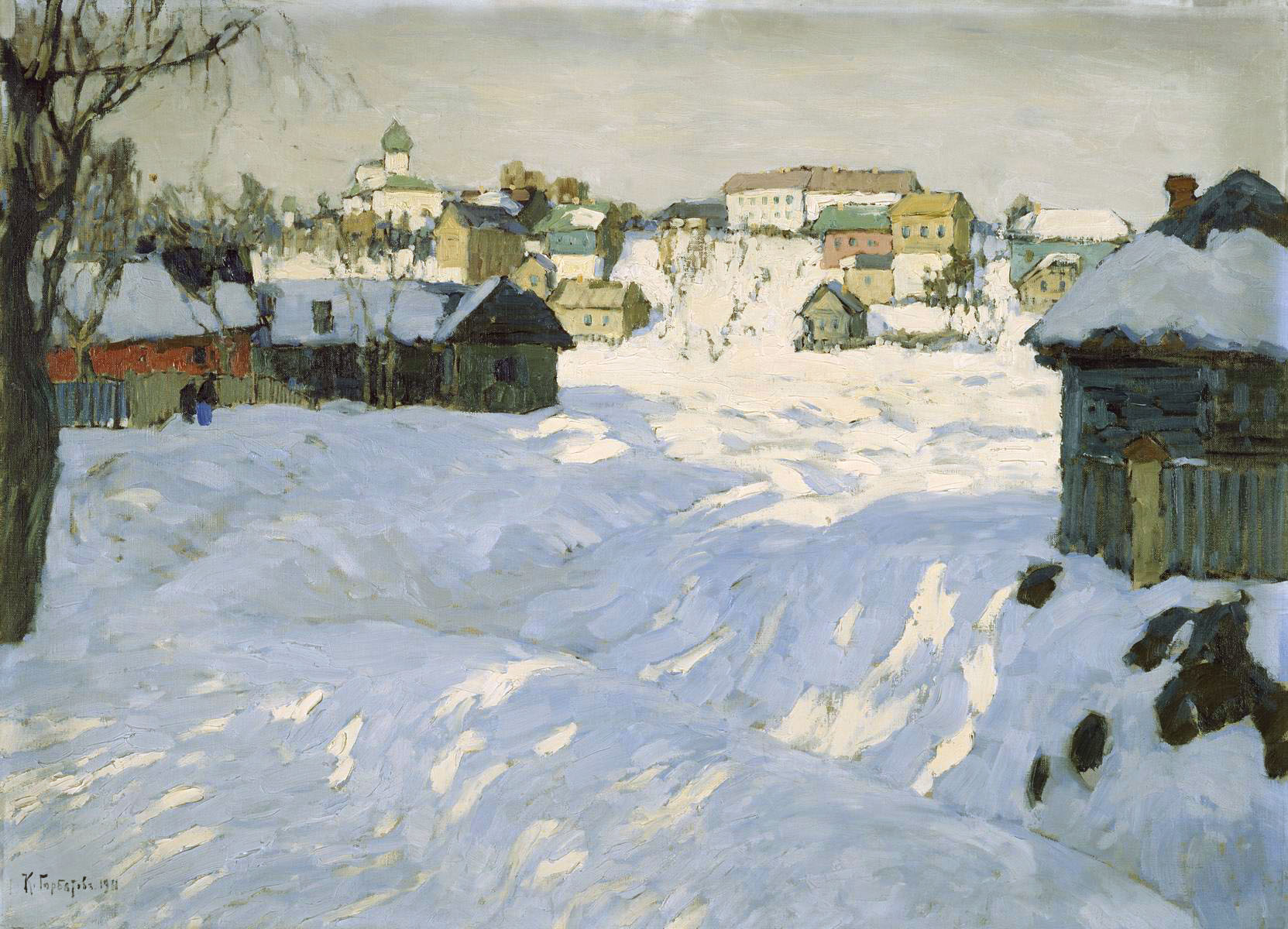
Constantin Gorbatov, The Old Town in Winter (1911). Erwin Vollmer, The Orchard (1917).

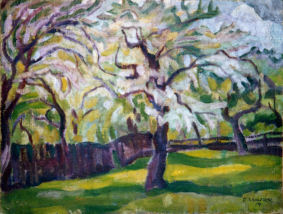

Three years later, Harry is married and a father. One day, he stops in front of two small paintings exhibited in his bookshop: this desolate street under the snow and this luxuriant garden in spring arouse violent emotions in him, confused reminiscences. He buys them and then lets friends take him to the artist's studio. He had forgotten Ada, but her embarrassment touches him. Both of them soon move from memories to confidences. Harry often saw Ada in his dreams, without knowing who she was: she took him by the hand and led him somewhere. The young man tries to make his wife understand what is upsetting him in this painting, where he feels he has found himself. But Laurence mocks his exaltation and refuses to receive Ada, of whom she is jealous, even though she considers her as insignificant as she is proud.

Harry and Ada become friends, then lovers. While Laurence considers separating, Ben – now the Sinner's stockbroker – chooses, in order not to lose her forever, to let Ada live her passion. She survives by selling a few paintings and caricatures to newspapers.

Some time later, as Harry prepares to divorce his wife and marry Ada, Ben resurfaces. He has engaged the Sinner household in fraudulent financial dealings. Ready to flee, he predicts that Harry will be unable to avoid prison or disgrace, but will not forgive his mistress for reconnecting him with his outcast roots. The young woman hopes that the influential Delarcher will be able to quell the scandal. Confident of Laurence's support for her husband if she herself leaves his life, Ada still hesitates to give up her love forever: a deportation order encompassing Ben's entire family, followed by news from South America where he is waiting for his mother, makes her decide.

In an Eastern European town full of refugees, Ada gives birth with the help of a neighbour who will look after the baby when she goes back to work. Convinced that Harry has not ceased to love her, realizing that she has been happy, she relies on her courage, her child and her art to continue to be happy.

== The characters ==
"This novel is a story about Jews": so begins the prière d'insérer (inserted prayer) that Némirovsky sent to her publisher Albin Michel in April 1940. If the title sheds light on the relationships between the characters, the three heroes in particular embody different facets or ideas of the author.

=== Heroes who are close to the author ===
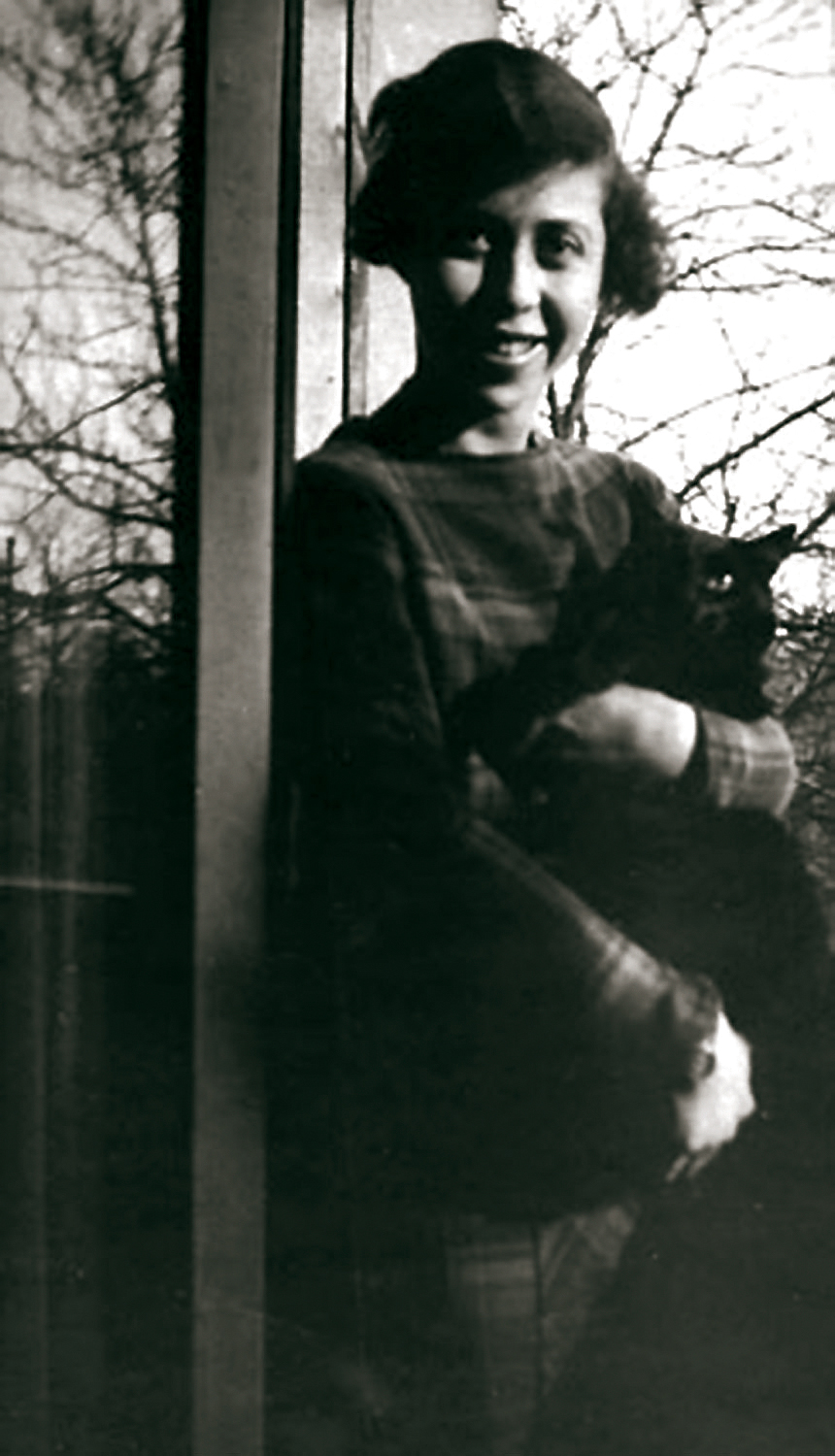
Irène Némirovsky (shown here at 25) put a lot of herself into the character of Ada.

Each of the three protagonists is both opposed to and united with the other two, while remaining solitary. Ada grew up with Ben and marries him, but he is motivated by money, which leads to social recognition, and she by her artistic quest. She is also not of the same world as Harry, who is himself isolated in his in-laws. As for Harry and Ben, they are brothers-in-arms – dog and wolf.

Ada Sinner has many points in common with the author Irène Némirovsky, to the point of appearing to be "cut from the same cloth": born in Kiev at the dawn of the century, with a strong temperament under a fragile exterior, adoring her father who was in business, and hating her aunt (a substitute for her mother), who returned the favour. Caught up in her vocation as an artist at an early age, she works for newspapers (illustrated): Similarly, the young Irène had moved away from the beaten track of her milieu at an early age to become "the writer of stubborn solitude", and she published in magazines. "If Irène [Némirovsky] chose an artist as the heroine of this novel, it was not by accident".

Accustomed to suffering, Ada endures exile through her painting and her passion for Harry. She thus falls into one of the two categories to which Jonathan Weiss refers to the novelist's Jewish characters: those who are generous and draw their strength from a long and painful history of persecution. The young artist draws all her inspiration from the Jewish world, both past (the Ukraine of her childhood) and present (the Rue des Rosiers); she has no faith at all, but a strong sense of her historical and cultural identity: "Ada personifies Irène Némirovsky's latent Jewishness", say Olivier Philipponnat and Patrick Lienhardt. Susan Rubin Suleiman also sees in the heroine's pictorial choices a mise en abyme of what her author has always sought through her writing: to pierce the secrets of families and broken couples, of people who are unhappy or especially bruised by prejudice, historical upheavals, and the constant difficulty of adapting.

Harry Sinner has a "hooked nose", "frizzy hair", a "weak and sickly look", and he feels uncomfortable among his French friends once he has admitted "the ascendancy of his Jewish side" – a portrait that must have pleased the antisemites of the time. Harry feels attracted to Ada less by erotic passion than by "the obscure call of blood", and because her painting provides him with a key to access his "true self" beyond the social self he has constructed for himself. Like her, Harry comes from a bourgeoisie that has been enriched and westernised for two generations, and is also reminiscent of Némirovsky, especially in the late 1930s: Speaking as little Russian as possible and ignoring Yiddish, he is steeped in French culture, but discovers with pain that he remains a foreigner in the eyes of the French – a double exile. Like her, "he is the quintessential assimilated Jew", and feels as distant from the poor of the ghetto as from the shady speculators, two extremes to which the prevailing antisemitism reduces the Jewish people. He also hates Ben as an excited and scowling alter ego.

Ben Sinner is Harry's dark double. He has the same physique but a much more determined character: it is he who compares Harry to the dog awaiting punishment, while he himself would be the barking wolf who always bounces back. Némirovsky's diary shows that this ambitious character was inspired by the swindler Alexandre Stavisky. Expelled from the country for his involvement in a financial scandal whose scope and consequences remain unclear, Ben falls into the second category of characters analysed by Jonathan Weiss: those whose generous instinct has been diverted by the need to get rich, such as David Golder, of whom he is a new version. Always in search of love and recognition, this unloved man who has nothing and can never settle anywhere is reminiscent of the wandering Jew. It is also possible that the novelist was thinking of the savage nobility that the wolf sometimes embodies in the literary tradition, notably the famished and independent wolf of La Fontaine's fable (as opposed to the polite but servile dog): however, there is no evidence of this in her workbooks, and the central issue here is not freedom.

=== Secondary characters ===
Ada and Ben's family is based on the activity of the little girl's father, Israel, who is loving but very busy: flexible and firm at the same time in business, he is a probable figure – among many others in her work – of Némirovsky's father. Aunt Rhaïssa is Israel's sister-in-law: downgraded by her widowhood, a volcanic mistress with no tenderness, she is reminiscent of the author's hated mother. As for Lilla, her eldest daughter, everyone agrees that she is as foolish as she is beautiful. As for the grandfather, an intellectual who has travelled, he had to become a jeweller out of necessity. Ada discovered Russian and foreign classics in his library long before he went to declaim Racine at the Alliance française. In the evening he works on an essay, Character and Rehabilitation of Shylock, "that is to say, to repair prejudices; his life's work will be thrown into the fire by the Cossacks" during the pogrom: the old man loses his reason. Finally, Mrs. Mimi joins the family: fine and understanding, she is a faded archetype of the elegant Parisian who would have known her hours of glory at the court of Petersburg.

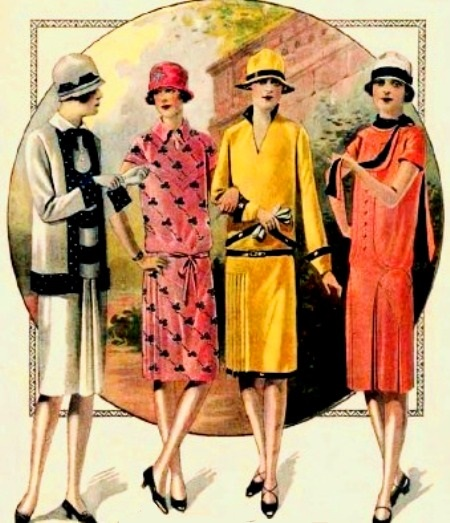
Women's fashion in the 1920s: Ada cannot compete with Harry's elegant friends.

In Harry's circle, the impressive patriarch who founded the Sinner empire in Ukraine, who kept his Yiddish accent, took care of the children during the pogrom and entrusted Israel with some good business deals, stands out: according to Myriam Anissimov, he is representative of the Jewish bourgeois of the first Merchants' Guild, who had obtained the right to reside in Kiev. His sons Isaac and Salomon, who made the bank prosper in Europe, remained nostalgic for the pre-1914 and pre-1917 world, which left Ben's hands free for risky speculation. Harry's aunts, elegant and very snobbish, display an arrogance due to their upbringing in luxury. His mother, an awkward and touching Jewish mother, is terrified that her son will fall back into the ghetto because of Ada. This upper-middle-class woman, driven by class prejudice and ashamed of her origins, also reflects, but only in this, Némirovsky's mother. As for the Delarchers, heirs to an old French bank, they will never really accept – Laurence included – the Jewish Harry Sinner. Laurence's father presents in a long inner monologue and hypocritical circumlocution a "veritable stall of anti-Semitic opinion".

Simple silhouettes are added to these two circles as the story progresses: neighbours and acquaintances from the ghetto, Harry's worldly and superficial friends, the refugees who surround Ada when her child is born. Her neighbour Rose Liebig, in particular, has been chased out of everywhere while her husband languishes in a concentration camp, and her children are scattered across Europe. Weiss notes that the novelist makes this Eastern European town the first place where the heroine no longer feels alone.

=== The meaning of the title ===
As a realistic novelist, Némirovsky always sought to conceive of social "types" in Balzac's style – which, from her point of view, "meant creating contemporary figures in contemporary situations, while forcing the line to highlight the type.

The double metaphor of the title The Dogs and the Wolves reflects a social dichotomy, and structures the whole novel. It allows the characters to be categorized, but in a way that is neither fixed nor exclusive. Thus the opposition between the wolf-Ben, a vulgar and restless starving man, and the dog-Harry, elegant and refined-is qualified by their physical resemblance. Similarly, Ada, whose fierce independence brings her closer to the wolf, loves Harry and not Ben. Yet Harry hides a great sensitivity beneath his aggressive exterior, and even an "artistic" side in the scaffolding of his financial combinations. As for Harry's uncles, by giving the young adventurer carte blanche, they reveal behind a harmless facade the part of the 'wolf' that is in them.

== A personal narrative ==
The Dogs and the Wolves is not an autobiographical novel like Le Vin de solitude (The Wine of Solitude), published in 1935: Némirovsky nevertheless draws heavily on memories of her childhood in Kiev. On the other hand, she embraces the moods of her various characters, but avoids pathos.

=== Places and scenes ===
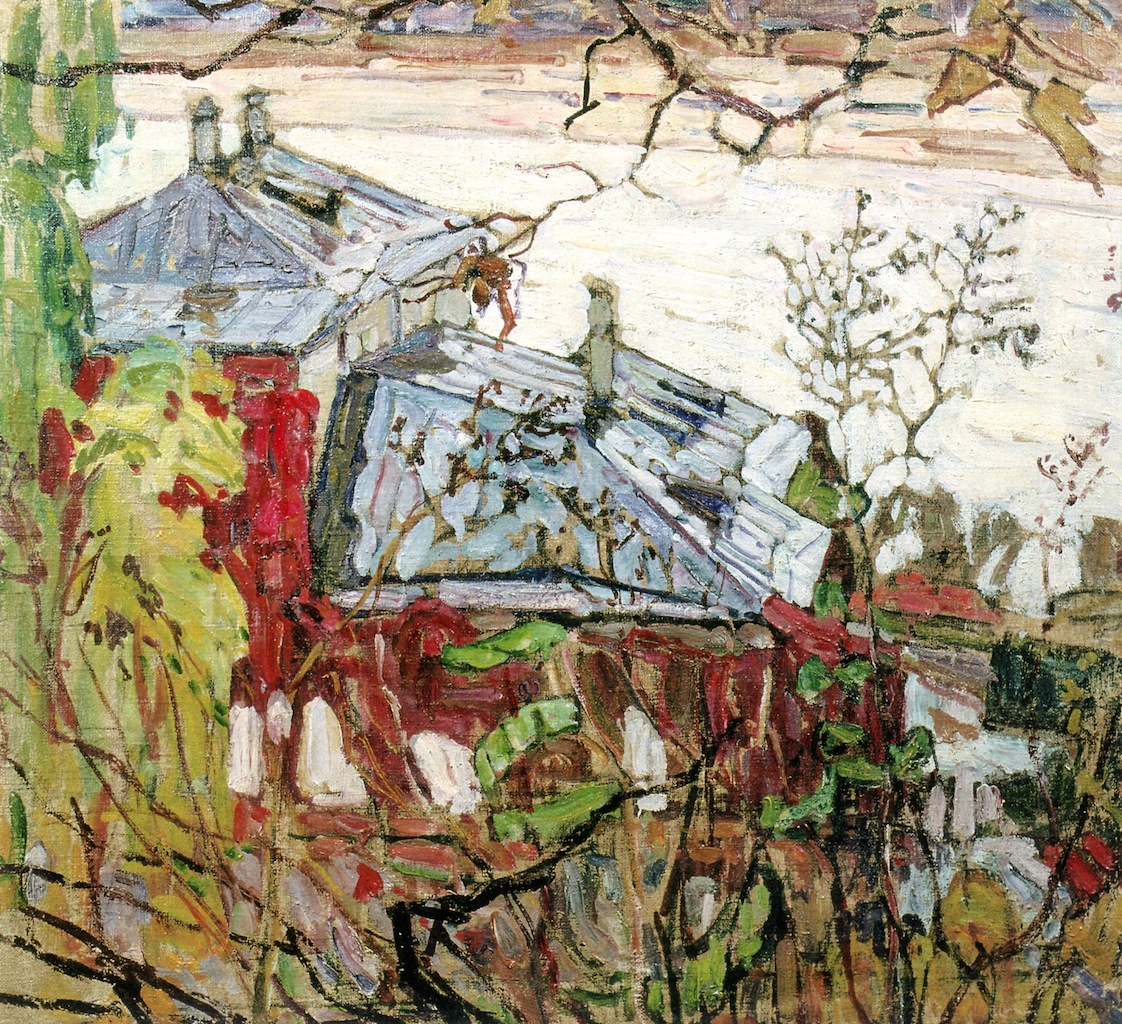
A. Manievich, The Dnieper in Kiev (1910–1913). Images of Kiev inform this novel, and the paintings of its heroine.

The story opens with a quasi-sociological description of the three main districts of a city in the Russian Empire. It is not named but corresponds to Kiev, where the author lived her first eleven years. Némirovsky emphasises the class divisions between Jews.

Czarist Russian law assigned Jews to specific streets or areas, but "merit, astuteness or wallet" could allow some, such as the Némirovskys, to establish themselves in the residential area among high ranking Russian and Polish officials and aristocrats. The opulent mansions of the "upper town" dazzled Ada: the Sinner's large columned house, defended by its golden gates and old lime trees, was reminiscent of the one at 11 Pushkin Street, where Leonid and Anna Némirovsky had rented a spacious flat in 1910. The flowery, fragrant gardens that Mikhail Bulgakov also sang about were Irene's usual setting as a child. Like her little heroine, she walked through the large green parks with ponds, ice-cream parlours and bandstands, which reinforce the realistic anchoring of the story: Nicholas Square, the Botanical Garden, the Tsar's Garden, the Merchant's Circle. Even if it is not historically accurate, the novelist distinguishes among the members of this caste a loyalty, of the order of morality if not of faith, to religious traditions.

The "lower town" by the river is nothing more than the ghetto where the ancestors of those who have become gentrified lived. In the slums, ragged children and squalid shopkeepers who speak only Yiddish and are presented as fanatically religious are crammed together. Némirovsky depicts them as she may have glimpsed them at times, but mostly as her mother (like Harry's in the fiction) fantasized about them: an untouchable scum. She lends every Jew from below the dream of rising one day by passing through the "middle city": there the rest of the population is placed according to its resources, and the Judaic traditions gradually fall away. The use of Yiddish seems to her to be a clear indicator of a recent social ascension. "In her description of the Jewish Kiev of her childhood, Némirovsky discerned the vertical drama that was played out between the excluded and the chosen, the latter linked to the former by an unpleasant instinct of consanguinity."

Némirovsky remembers the craftsmen, the dvorniks (caretakers), the maklers (brokers), the students in caps and Russian shirts, the "observant Jews with fur hats and levites". She recounts street scenes, furtive idylls in the parks. The heady scents of flowers have left their mark on the olfactory memory of the already asthmatic child she was, and her heroine finds them almost stifling. The novelist has ruled out an episode at the home of a famous Parisian milliner; instead, she imagines the Alliance festivities based on a charity party at the "French Home", where at the age of eight she had recited a tirade from Edmond Rostand's L'Aiglon.

=== Narrative, style, and registers ===
The narrative follows the chronology of the fiction, which is spread over about twenty-five years, with no precise dates except for the family's departure for France just before the Great War. The thirty-three chapters, each a few pages long, are separated by ellipses of varying length. They often begin with a time indication ("One day...", "Two years later...", "Harry and Laurence had been married for more than three years..."), or "in medias res" ("We'd better separate", said Laurence, "Ada ran downstairs behind him..."), plunging the reader into a new scene.

The story is told in the third person by a narrator who is external to the story and omniscient. However, to better share with the reader the thoughts and feelings of the characters, even the secondary ones, he constantly shifts to internal focus. Thanks in particular to the use of interior monologue and free indirect discourse, Némirovsky multiplies the points of view to get as close as possible to each of the characters: She maintains an ironic distance from some (the aunts, Harry's mother) and seems to empathise with those who suffer or express something about her. She does not make her point of view explicit either, assuming the risk of ambiguity inherent in this "refusal of narrative judgement": in any case, as far as the protagonists are concerned, a negative view is always counterbalanced by an opposite or more subtle view.

Némirovsky adopts "at times the tone of sociological analysis", when she describes the stratification of the city or the habits and customs of its Jewish inhabitants. As in The Wine of Solitude and as in the story of her heroine Ada, she paints scenes that move the viewer strongly, but "devoid of all feeling". While the picturesque scenes from childhood occupy the first third of the book, the Parisian settings are barely sketched in the following. The author's own experience has nevertheless provided her with some scenes that she treats in a satirical way, such as the visit of Harry's friends to Ada's studio, the social evenings he later takes her to, or the heroine's very painful delivery.

Between the spring and summer of 1938, working in parallel on another novel in the same vein, Némirovsky reaffirmed for herself the style she wanted to return to: "short, hard sentences. [...] that the book, though short, should seem to be bursting at the seams", with numerous dialogues which, like the interior monologues, occasionally draw on the familiar register.

== Essential themes ==
The Dogs and the Wolves, Némirovsky explains, is a story "not about French Jews, but about Jews from the East, from the Ukraine or Poland [...] and which, for all sorts of reasons, could only happen to Jews". Although she never denied her Ashkenazi origins, the novelist only knew about them through her family, who had moved away from them once their fortune was made. Thus, more than a language, customs or religious rites that are unfamiliar to her, she seeks to render an experience. She attributes to her heroes a particular form of sensitivity, and seems to come close to a community marked by suffering.

=== Dreams and ambition ===
The Dogs and the Wolves revolves around one of the two central themes of Némirovsky's work, "masterfully treated" here as in David Golder or Le Bal: "the social ascent and desire to integrate of poor Eastern Jews who become rich by dint of ambition [...] and, more generally, the feverish existence of marginalised "foreigners", always at odds with the French bourgeois society to which they aspire to belong".

"For the first time the Jewish subject [of the] book is not a businessman but an artist". The world of business, more or less dubious, provides the backdrop, as is so often the case with Némirovsky, but the protagonists are not attached to money. Harry, who has always had money, is not good at making it and finds it unworthy to mix feelings with it. Ben blames him for these "European pretensions […] What you call success, victory, love, hatred, I call money! For Ben, money brings recognition: he knows that he has to defeat others and make a fortune in order to achieve more than security, but rather existence itself. He corresponds to an opinion expressed elsewhere by Némirovsky: "A Jew loves money as a symbol of what he could do". Ada, though dazzled as a child by the Sinner's luxury, attaches no importance to money; she even refuses to allow her lover to give her any, because she dreads the chains of a bourgeois comfort which, moreover, risks being torn from her.

Money is therefore not an end in itself for the heroes, but at most a means to an ideal. Ada may have a real talent for painting, Lilla may have the makings of an actress: the narrator, who is the author's spokesman, considers it "characteristic of the Jewish spirit" that Israel lets them go so far away to try to fulfil a dream. The protagonists recognize themselves a way of loving, of desiring, obstinate, even excessive. Némirovsky has her heroine say: "We are a greedy race, starving for so long that reality is not enough to feed us. We still need the impossible". "Rich or poor, persecuted or successful, the Jews in Irène Némirovsky's work will forever be "dreamers of the ghetto", Philipponnat and Lienhardt summarise.

=== Unwanted everywhere ===
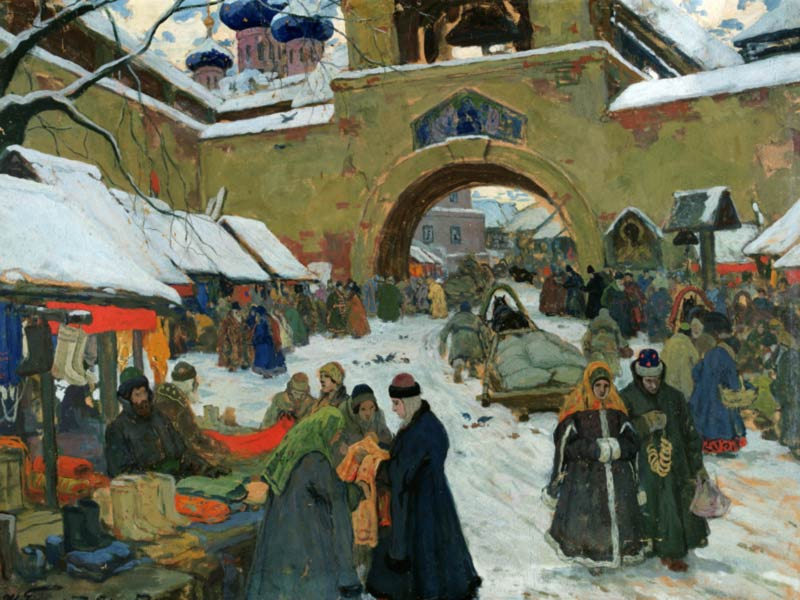
I. Goryuchkin, Market Day in the Old Town (1910). None of the characters is nostalgic for a hostile Orthodox Ukraine.

Némirovsky was two and a half years old at the time of the 1905 pogroms in Kiev and Odessa (the birthplace of her paternal family): on October 18, she was hidden under a bed with an Orthodox cross around her neck by her parents' Russian cook. She later uses the family accounts to reconstruct this wave of barbarism in The Dogs and the Wolves. Three chapters tell the story of the pogrom, contrasting Ada's naïve viewpoint with the brutality of the events.

The adults of the shtetl felt the threat rising, the periodicity of which seemed to depend on irrational factors (heatwave, famine, princely events...). For a week, looting, rapes and murders remained sporadic; the children no longer went out, they were made to sleep half-dressed; and every evening the excitement of a crowd shouting insults while breaking windows swelled. The arrival of the troops triggers the worst violence: Ada and Ben hear them from the attic before witnessing them while fleeing the ghetto. Screams of hatred and the sound of bells cover the cries for help, while the massacre is led by fanatical popes and galloping Cossacks... The fury subsides in a few days. "Nothing is more moving in this book", says Jonathan Weiss, "than the description of the pogrom, where the patriotic hymns and religious chants of the Ukrainian mob become 'a savage, inhuman clamour' that terrorises the two children."

In the end, France is not much more hospitable. Ada, who has never broken the law, is wrapped up in the deportation order against her husband. Although she is a talented artist who has lived in Paris for a long time, she is considered an "undesirable foreigner". In her last asylum, where Jewish and stateless refugees help each other, the heroine hears talk of concentration camps: at that time, Némirovsky can fear, but no more than anyone else, the fate that will soon be reserved for the Jews of Europe.

=== The sense of belonging ===
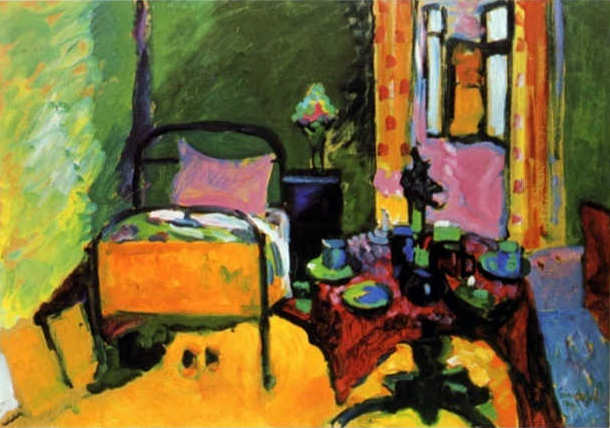
Kandinsky, The Room (1909). Ada hopes to be safe at last in her little refugee room.

In what was her last "Jewish" novel, Némirovsky expressed, as in her others, her acute awareness of the discomfort, even the haunting, that contact with their poor and newly immigrated co-religionists aroused in some upper-class Jews. The protagonists of the novel, while not suffering from exile from their antisemitic homeland, are nonetheless in search of their people and their roots.

Ada feeds her work with her memories and seeks an aesthetic that is able to capture the reality she experienced in the Russian Empire as well as her belonging to the Jewish people. Her painting helps Harry to realise that he had cut himself off from his own truth by forgetting his popular and especially Jewish roots: "Our roots are over there... – You mean in Russia? – No, I don't mean Russia. Further... deeper..." Through his love for Ada, Harry goes on a spiritual journey from ignorance to acceptance of his Jewishness. For Ben, the myth of the wandering Jew – revived by the antisemitic right in the 1930s – implicitly serves to make him the conscious repository of the entire memory of a people, of which he feels traces, an obscure knowledge, within himself. The end of the story, which is a hymn to Jewish solidarity, especially among women, also proves him right on one point: a common past of misery or humiliation "creates a solidarity that cannot be forgotten, not that of race, not that of blood, but of tears shed".

For the characters, the feeling of belonging is therefore based less on a filiation or a religious and cultural heritage than on an experience, "a common past, a shared history and especially centuries of oppression". In the end, according to J. Weiss, "the essence of Jewish identity is to be found [...] in solidarity, artistic creation and the hope that only a child can represent for the future". The curiously optimistic fate that the novelist reserves for her heroine seems to echo a sentence copied from one of her notebooks without mentioning its source: "The form of despair peculiar to Judaism contains, in itself, a formal hope...".

That her novelistic double exhibits her Russian and Jewish roots is in any case the sign of an intimate mutation of Némirovsky. If she had never tried to hide her origins, she did not claim them either: here, she diffracts through her heroes not only her subjective vision of the Jews but also the nuances of her own evolution regarding the fact of feeling Jewish.

== A break in Némirovsky's work ==
The circumstances of the Second World War meant that the publishing of The Dogs and the Wolves met with little response. It is since the rediscovery of Némirovsky in the 2000s that the stereotypes about Jews that it contains, as well as the previous ones, have been able to fuel the debate about the author's alleged antisemitism. For specialists of her work, this novel, beyond apparently calculated ambiguities, reveals rather that she was increasingly aware of the situation of the Jewish people. In any case, through her writing, she clearly distances herself from the contemptuous clichés about the Jews.

=== Drafting and first reception ===
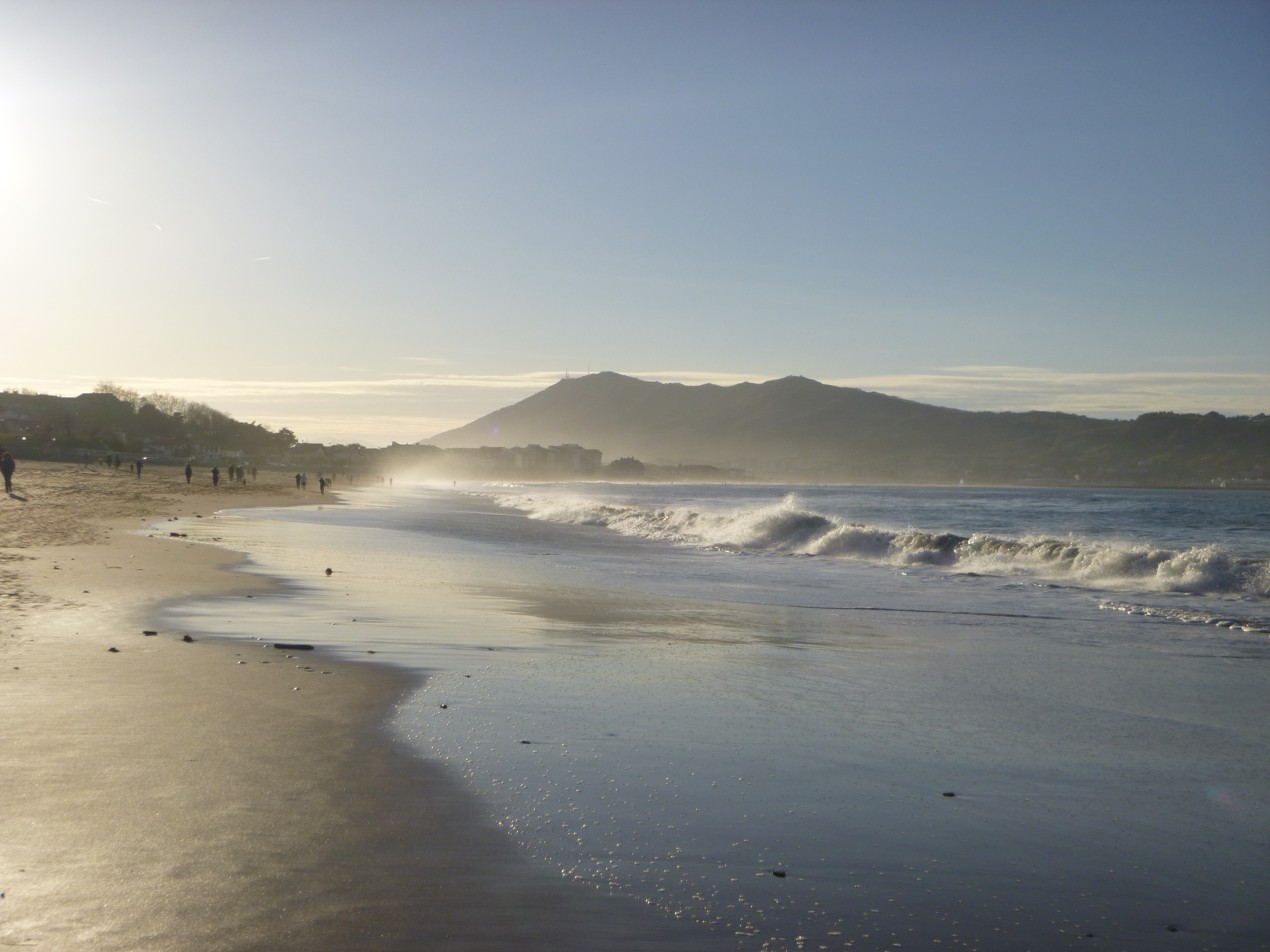
The great beach of Hendaye, where I. Némirovsky stayed again with his family in the summer of 1938 and 1939.

During the summer of 1938, which she often spent with her family in the Basque country, Némirovsky completed Le Charlatan, whose hero is a Levantine adventurer, a cynical swindler, a parvenu thirsty for love. At the same time, abandoning the ambitious and provocative project of a novel entitled Le Juif, she is already drafting "the Jewish version of Le Charlatan". In her diary, she planned "the story of a family of Russian Jews – yes, always! – where there is a son who becomes Stav[isky]", and she tentatively calls it Children of the Night. The story may have its origin and its future title in a diary entry from May: "Paint the wolves! I don't care about animals in a tribe, nor about domestic animals. Wolves are my business, my talent." Philipponnat and Lienhardt believe that Franz Werfel's The Forty Days of Musa Dagh, which left a strong impression on her, and which in 1933 anticipates a kinship between the Armenian genocide and the rise of Nazism, is also among the unconscious sources of her new novel.

Némirovsky continued writing in the autumn of 1938 and at the beginning of the following year, while multiplying her work for food (lectures, literary "talks", short stories), while Deux, presented as her first love novel, was a great success, and Les Échelles du Levant was published in serial form in Gringoire between May and August 1939. The final title seems to have imposed itself on the novelist at the end of January 1939: "The Dogs and the Wolves caught between the darkness and the flames of hell", she noted on the 24th.

Némirovsky then moved to Fayard, whose nationalist weekly Candide had a circulation of over 400,000 and which offered her 34,000 francs. The Dogs and the Wolves was serialized in Candide between October 11, 1939 and January 17, 1940, during the Phoney War. Albin Michel, who saw it as a masterpiece of the novelist, published it in volume form at the beginning of April 1940, a few weeks before Hitler's offensive against Belgium and the Netherlands. This dramatic context explains why the novel went virtually unnoticed by the critics, although it sold seventeen thousand copies, was reprinted in October, and even, by special permission, in February 1942.

=== The usual clichés? ===
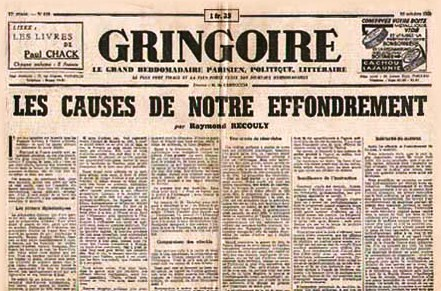
In the April 25, 1940, issue of Gringoire, Pierre Lœwel takes the clichés of the novel at face value.

In The Dogs and the Wolves, Némirovsky repeats the more or less pejorative stereotypes already present in David Golder and other novels of hers. Myriam Anissimov believes that the novelist "knew nothing of Jewish spirituality, of the richness and diversity of Eastern European Jewish civilisation". In her preface to Suite française, she lists for the record the commonplaces that fall from Némirovsky's pen in her "Jewish" novels: numerous and unpleasant physical characteristics, character traits such as pugnacity but also hysteria, atavism of greed or commercial skill, simplistically opposed types (the well-assimilated rich man and the miserable man thirsty for success), etc. Jonathan Weiss, though less critical than for David Golder, concedes that "the same stereotypes of Jews that Irène has used in other novels are found in The Dogs and the Wolves". Even the heroine, comparing her husband and her lover, reduces them to a cliché: "suffering, intelligent and sad".

In preparing this book, Némirovsky evoked "the eternal Jewish background passing through [...] the French intellectual and the artist". In the name of a truth, the subjective nature of which she admits, she attributes to several characters physical, moral or social traits that seem to be drawn from the reservoir of antisemitic clichés of the inter-war period. And just as she had done to defend her novel David Golder, often read as a portrait-charge, she is content to declare in her "insert" that "there is no 'taboo' subject in literature", and that she paints the Jewish people, from the ghetto to the financial world, as she has seen them, "as they are, with their qualities and their defects".

Perhaps it is his own feeling that Némirovsky lends to her hero Harry: "Like all Jews, he was even more keenly, more painfully scandalised than a Christian by specifically Jewish faults", because he fears that this will damage his own image – for all that, he soon cannot stand it when (his wife) speaks ill of Jews. The novelist, Susan Suleiman argues, "was acutely aware of the discomfort that contact with poor, unassimilated Jews caused some upper-class Jews, who were genuinely afraid of falling back into the ghetto". While the author is aware that a more persecuted community than ever might reproach him for not only "glorifying [his] virtues and weeping over [his] misfortunes", he hopes that this will not lead to a generalisation, nor will it mask his sympathy.

The American scholar reminds us that the figure of the lousy Jew, with its various stereotypes, has been a topos in Jewish and non-Jewish literature since the late nineteenth century. She points out that in this text, as in others, Némirovsky sordidly evokes poor Orthodox Jewish circles not to stigmatise them, but to denounce their profound misery.

=== Caricature of antisemitic prejudice ===
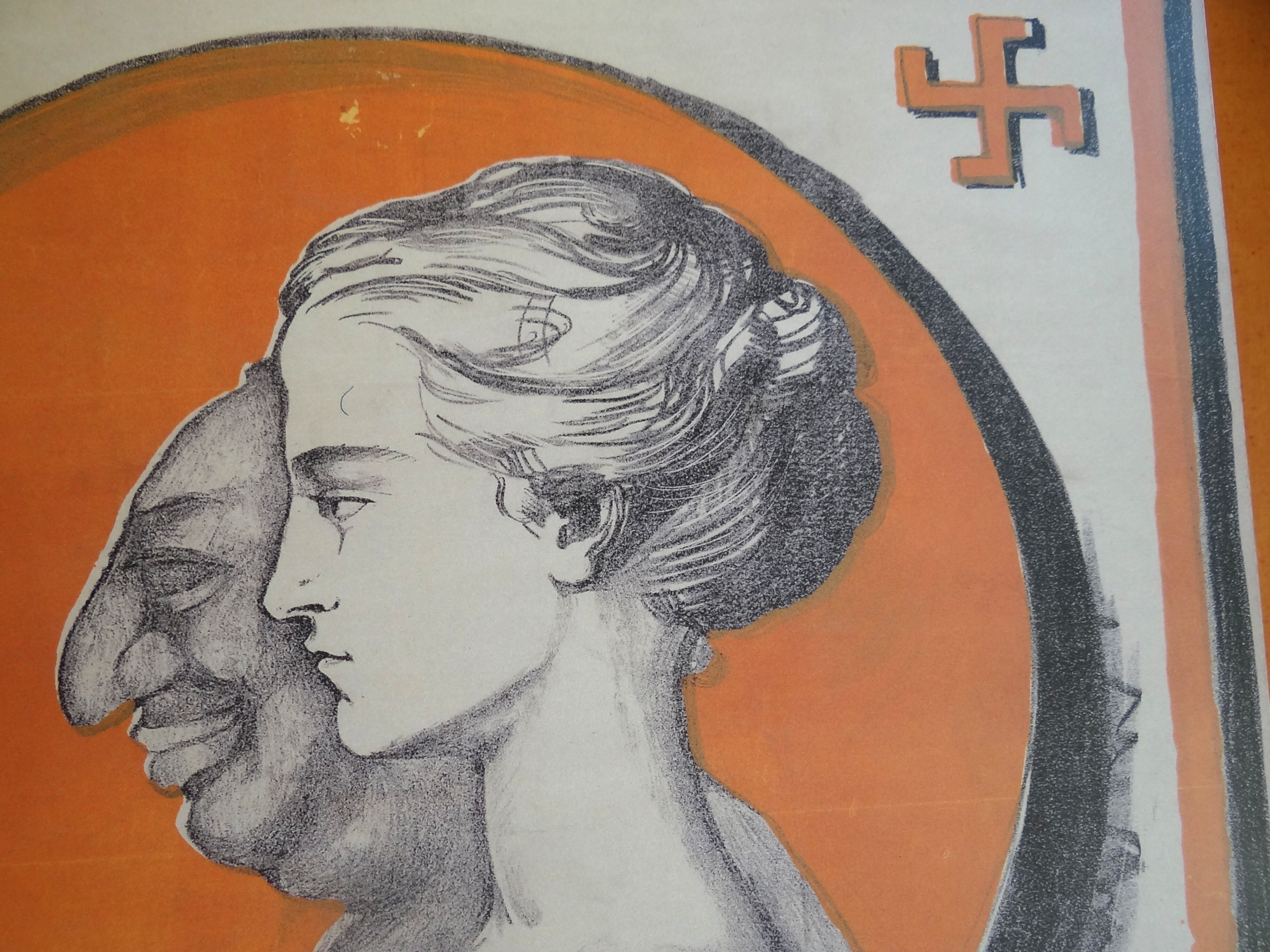
German propaganda against mixed marriages (1920s). Delarcher dreads the union of his daughter with one of the Jews he hates.

From the top to the bottom of the social scale, the Jews in this story are the target of an antisemitism that the author discredits thanks to the subtleties of the writing: she takes care to distinguish the judgements made about themselves by the heroes from those of other characters clearly designated as antisemites.

Ben and Ada's neighbours, for example, are suspicious of them, of the way they eat, of their suspicious origin. The banker Delarcher in particular, in his long interior monologue, offers the whole range of antisemitic clichés and fears of the 1930s. Xenophobic, he would still prefer to marry his daughter to a Latin than to a "Slav, Levantine, Jew"; he feels nothing but repulsion for "this tribe", these Sinner "with their oily complexion", with their "silent gait like that of cats", with the "small ironic and anguished smile peculiar to those of their race"; he hates their snobbery, their jewel-covered wives, and above all, their immense fortune with "international ties", "Laurence herself maintains that her husband has nothing to do with "those strange men [with] curls on their cheeks" painted by Ada. Laurence herself maintains that her husband has nothing to do with "those strange men [with] curls on their cheeks" painted by Ada. But she reproaches him, as she does them, with 'an extremely unpleasant hysterical side', and the young artist with a specifically Jewish "mixture of insolence and servility".

In all these passages, Némirovsky makes skillful use of the narrator's intrusions in the middle of the dialogue, of free indirect speech, of suspension points: through the use of the second degree, she makes the words contradict or dynamite themselves, so that incoherence and bad faith jump out, and the absurdity of stereotypes appears. For the first time in his work", says Jonathan Weiss, "the anti-Semitic discourse is undermined from within".

=== Assumed ambiguities ===
For Myriam Anissimov, the "cruel and pejorative" antisemitic prejudices that Némirovsky seems to have adopted reveal a terrible "relationship of self-hatred". Jonathan Weiss, on the other hand, thinks that the novelist has internalized negative clichés that basically revolt her, and that she projects them in her work while trying to invent another image, especially in The Dogs and the Wolves. He points out that the story ends with the birth of a child "without any known traits", free from stereotypes. Angela Kershaw, in her study of Némirovsky, rejects the idea that she was plagued by self-hatred, basing herself on this novel in particular.

She explains that the novelist, anxious to "meet" a wide readership, bets in the thirties on the "Russian fashion" launched by Kessel, for example, and then even on a certain antisemitic climate: "conscious of selling the "Slavic soul" or the Jewish "inassimilability", she exploits the prejudices of French readers, sending them back to their reductive expectations of Slavs, Jews, Levantines, in order to make fun of them. Thus when the snobs who accompany Harry to Ada's studio find her deeply Dostoyevskian, and her painting authentic and barbaric. An examination of Némirovsky's notebooks shows that these "ambiguities" "result from calculated risks". Angela Kershaw recalls that the author "does not pass judgement on her characters, who are themselves torn between opposing clichés", and shows that it is precisely in The Dogs and the Wolves that she systematises this stance. The characters are particularly complex, "neither Russian, nor Jewish, nor French, nor Christian, but all at the same time", which makes the very notion of identity waver, and avoids both idealism and ideological recuperation.

The Dogs and the Wolves thus marks a turning point in the way Némirovsky exploits the recurrent antisemitic stereotypes in her work. Through her narrative, she strips them more openly of any hostile dimension, and seeks above all to elucidate her own relationship to Jewishness.

== The echo of a deep concern ==
At the end of the 1930s, the context was one of a tremendous upsurge in antisemitic propaganda and a tightening of the status of foreigners present on French territory. Némirovsky therefore hurried to re-launch a naturalisation procedure. At the same time she converted to Catholicism with her husband and daughters. Her novel The Dogs and the Wolves reflects her growing concerns during this period about protecting the French people. In it she tries to describe the dilemmas of assimilation for the Jews.

=== Naturalization rejected ===
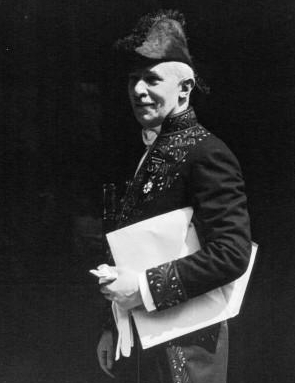
The guarantee of the academician André Chaumeix did not allow Irène Némirovsky to be naturalised.

In 1930, when she was shortlisted for the Goncourt Prize, Némirovsky postponed her application for naturalisation, which would have facilitated the awarding of the prize but would have risked tainting the sincerity of her approach to her adopted country.

On November 23, 1938, Irène and Michel Epstein (her husband) filed a new request with the Prefecture of Police, accompanied by letters of recommendation. Two leading figures in the literary world vouched for her: Jean Vignaud, a critic who ran Le Petit Parisien, and André Chaumeix, an academician and director of the Revue des Deux Mondes, who praised Némirovsky's original and vigorous talent. However, the government has already taken measures to limit access to French nationality for refugees, stateless persons and other "undesirable foreigners". The procedure did not seem to be going badly at first, but it bogged down until the declaration of war, perhaps because Michel Epstein was unable to obtain their birth certificates – the fact that his wife was part of the French literary landscape did not change anything.

At the end of August 1939, the announcement of the German-Soviet pact meant that Irène and Michel Epstein, both Russian nationals, had no chance of obtaining their naturalisation. A new letter, presenting Irène Némirovsky as "a woman of letters of great talent" and this time addressed to the press and the authorities by their friend, the publisher Éditions Albin Michel, was not enough to unblock the case.

=== Baptism of Némirovsky ===
As all her biographers note, the writing of The Dogs and the Wolves coincided with Irène Némirovsky's conversion to Catholicism. She was baptized with her husband and two daughters on February 2, 1939, in the chapel of the Abbey of Sainte-Marie, in the 16th arrondissement of Paris: more than a precaution in those uncertain times, she seems to have done so for spiritual reasons.

According to her daughters' governess, Némirovsky converted for fear of the long-term consequences of antisemitism and Nazism. However, she could not delude herself that a simple baptismal certificate was a bulwark against those for whom the Jewish question was not religious but racial. Jonathan Weiss believes that her conversion was the result of her rejection of Jewish practices, of a certain infatuation with the rites and morals of Christianity, in the prevailing spiritual vacuum that is echoed in LeCharlatan. Philipponnat and Lienhardt temper this a little: Némirovsky knew and implemented Gospel values such as contempt for vanities or charity, but she never showed any religious or metaphysical angst. And if she had an abbot as a friend, she was not inclined to piety, and she also had very bad memories of the annual Orthodox processions in Kiev. Faced with the "rise of perils" at the end of the 1930s, with the process of her naturalisation at a standstill, Némirovsky's conversion betrayed, according to them, she has a "clear need for consolation" which her upbringing had not accustomed her to seek in Judaism. She urges her husband and their daughters to be baptized in an attempt to protect them.

Ironically, it is at the moment when she moves away from it through her baptism that the novelist seems to reconnect more deeply with her origins and to have a completely unequivocal view of the Jewish community. For Philipponnat and Lienhardt, the New Testament offers a kind of access to the Old Testament, and allows converts to find their religious and cultural roots: This perhaps explains why Sinner ("sinner" in German) was the name chosen for this Russian-Jewish family that aspires to assimilation – a kind of betrayal – while being caught up in its origins. As early as 1934, Némirovsky stated in a magazine: "The first effect of immense events such as wars and revolutions, both terrible and admirable, is to abolish the individual and the particular in us, and to bring to the surface of the soul the hereditary background that takes hold of the whole human being.

=== Jewish identity and assimilation ===
"Towards the end of the decade, while spiritually Christian, Irene seems to become particularly sensitive to the past of the Jewish people and especially to their suffering", making her novel The Dogs and the Wolves "the fullest and most explicit exploration of Jewish identities in Christian France."

In February 1937, in a short story entitled Fraternité, the novelist presented two Jews with the same name who met by chance on a station platform: one, a poor emigrant facing persecution, gave the other, a middle-class man perfectly integrated into French society, a sort of lesson in Jewish history and courage. Christian Rabinovitch, a refined bourgeois who foreshadows the character of Harry, becomes brutally aware of his deep cultural identity, his historical kinship with his namesake, and the perils that may befall him. This story, devoid of all clichés except for a few physical features, shows that Némirovsky has taken the measure of the complexity and fragility of the situation of the Jews in Europe.

Three years later The Dogs and the Wolves, also an extension of The Master of Souls, The Wine of Solitude, or even David Golder, shows characters divided between ambition and irony, towards themselves as well as towards non-Jews: each one is divided – hence their existential malaise – between pride in being oneself and the need to no longer be perceived as an outsider. Thus Ada or Ben, while deploring the mistrust of which they are the object or their fate as pariahs, occasionally take a harsh look at themselves, but nonetheless judge the French and their morals with a lucidity mixed with amusement. The heroine, like the Hélène of Vin de solitude, loves France deeply while claiming not to belong to it completely: from her point of view, it is the French who are foreigners, and she nourishes her art "with a feeling of distance and difference". Between two definitions of Jewishness, one biological, the other cultural, (Note: A third possible path is conspicuous by its absence: Jewishness as religious practice Suleiman (2017, p. 269).) Némirovsky opts for cultural heritage, to which are added the ups and downs of a long history. This novel "affirms the ineluctable resurgence of the Jewish character in the assimilated and the Christianized, that 'obscure and somewhat frightening feeling of carrying within oneself a past longer than that of most men'", that sixth sense which is called zakhor. (Note: Recurring injunction to remember in the Bible.)

In short", Némirovsky noted in the Fraternité working paper in 1936, "I demonstrate inassimilability". Although this theme could only have reinforced the prejudices of the antisemites of the time, it reflects the author's personal questioning, as a woman "grappling with the problems of Jewish identity and belonging". For her, and especially in a threatening context, "the determining factor of Jewish inassimilability was neither sociology nor biology, but history".

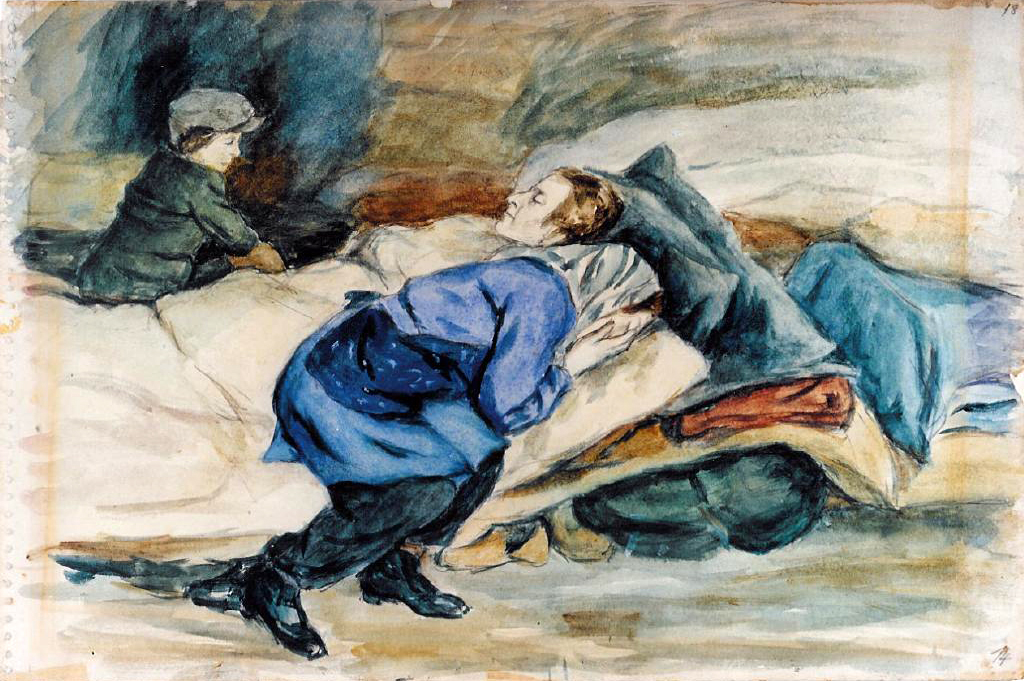
Malva Schalek, Arrival in Theresienstadt (1942–1944). Irène Némirovsky now lives in fear of deportation.

In The Dogs and the Wolves, antisemitism is unleashed from the East to the West of Europe, from the beginning of the century to the interwar period, from the murderous outbreaks against the Jews in the ghettos to the bourgeois haunting of an international Israelite finance. It is quite possible that in imagining Ada's story, Némirovsky was thinking of herself and of the possibility of being expelled from France to a Central European country: the international situation of 1938 and 1939 was enough to inspire her with the greatest fears. Knowing that she is increasingly in danger, she expresses in this novel her recent but profound conviction that every Jew, no matter how well he or she assimilates, will sooner or later always be sent back to his or her Jewishness alone.

This novel "tells a story of Jews who, no matter what they do, cannot escape their fate as Jews". Torn by her own situation, "Irène had never painted such a compassionate portrait of the Jewish people", concludes J. Weiss, followed by Philipponnat and Lienhardt: "to feel for the small Jewish people is exactly what Irène Némirovsky does" here. She manifests and tries to conjure up through her characters, especially her heroine, her fear that being Jewish in this dark period is indeed, more than an origin or a belonging, a destiny. This anxiety may explain the 'leap forward' that the story makes in the last two chapters, moving somewhat incoherently from the France of the 1920s to a Europe necessarily subsequent to Hitler's seizure of power in 1933 and the opening of the first concentration camps for opponents and "undesirables".

Némirovsky reconnects with a persecuted people and calls for openness and understanding: "If this solidarity does not go as far as taking a public stand in favour of the Jews or against discriminatory measures, Irène evacuates from her work, from 1939 onwards, any anti-Semitic or racist connotation". In this sense, The Dogs and the Wolves would be like a balance sheet as well as a farewell to Jewishness. Nevertheless, it seems that Némirovsky had planned in November 1940 to write a novel about the fate of the Jews at a later date, in better times.

== A little-known work ==
The Dogs and the Wolves, like her entire body of work, fell into oblivion after Némirovsky's sudden death as a victim of the Nazi genocide. The novel was not reissued by Éditions Albin Michel until 1988, almost half a century after its first publication. In 2004, the exceptional posthumous award of the Renaudot Prize for Suite française led to the gradual rediscovery of all of Némirovsky's texts: The Dogs and the Wolves was published in paperback (in French) in 2008, without arousing as much interest as Suite française or Le Bal.

When the novel was published in the UK the following year, it was well received. However, a review in the Times Literary Supplement found it to be very antisemitic, with Jewish characters perpetuating the worst racial clichés. (Note: His words are summarised by S. R. Suleiman Suleiman (2017, p. 278).) Perhaps adding to the controversy over some of Némirovsky's books translated in the early 2000s, The Dogs and the Wolves was still not published in the US as of 2017.

In an attempt to put an end to what she believes to be a false trial, initiated by Ruth Franklin (Note: American critic and essayist "R. Franklin".) in particular, Susan Rubin Suleiman has devoted years of research to The Némirovsky Question – Life, Death and Legacy of a Jewish Writer in 20th Century France. (Note: Edited by Yale University Press in 2016, under the title The Némirovsky Question. The Life, Death and Legacy of a Jewish Writer in 20th Century France, translated for Michel Albin and published in September 2017.) In line with her earlier work, she argues that the fact that a work includes demeaning stereotypes about Jews does not automatically lead to the conclusion that the author is self-hating and/or antisemitic. The precise writing and publication context, as well as the particular economy of the story, must be taken into account. For it must be determined whether or not the use of these stereotypes is in the vein of the "thesis novel", in this case "in a coherent system of meaning that seeks to discredit and harm the Jews". The American scholar relies on The Dogs and the Wolves, among other works, to demonstrate that such a dimension is absent from Némirovsky's works.

While Olivier Philipponnat and Patrick Lienhardt describe The Dogs and the Wolves as "a great novel of inassimilation to the comfortable French model", Susan Suleiman considers it as "Némirovsky's most sustained effort to examine the 'Jewish question'", at the crossroads between personal experience and collective history. Only "the changing situation of European Jewry", laments Jonathan Weiss, "has prevented this novel from being recognized as an important piece of Jewish literature.

== For more information ==
=== Bibliography ===
- Némirovsky, Irène (2008). Les Chiens et les Loups (in French). Librairie Générale Française/Hachette. p. 250. ISBN 9782253123545.
- Weiss, Jonathan (2005). Irène Némirovsky (in French). Paris: Éditions du Félin. p. 320. ISBN 9782866457204.
- Philipponnat, Olivier; Lienhardt, Patrick (2007). La Vie d'Irène Némirovsky (in French). Paris: Grasset/Denoël. p. 672. ISBN 9782253124887.
- Corpet, Olivier (2010). Irène Némirovsky, un destin en images (in French) (Denoël ed.). Paris: DENOEL. p. 144. ISBN 9782207109748.
- Suleiman, Susan Rubin (2017). La question Némirovsky (in French). Paris: Éditions Albin Michel. p. 428. ISBN 9782226315168.

=== External links ===
- "Éditions du roman Les Chiens et les Loups au catalogue de la BnF" (in French).
