= My Daughter Joy =

1950 film

- Directed by: Gregory Ratoff
- Written by: Robert Thoeren; William Rose
- Based on: David Golder by Irène Némirovsky
- Produced by: Gregory Ratoff
- Starring: Edward G. Robinson; Peggy Cummins; Richard Greene
- Cinematography: Georges Périnal
- Edited by: Raymond Poulton
- Music by: Raymond Gallois-Montbrun
- Production company: London Films
- Distributed by: British Lion Films
- Release date: 21 August 1950
- Running time: 81 minutes
- Country: United Kingdom
- Language: English
- Box office: £106,399 (UK)

My Daughter Joy is a 1950 British drama film directed by Gregory Ratoff and starring Edward G. Robinson, Peggy Cummins and Richard Greene. It was written by Robert Thoeren and Wiliam Rose. The screenplay concerns a millionaire who spoils his only daughter, but has a strained relationship with his wife.

The film is a loose adaptation of the 1929 novel David Golder by Irène Némirovsky, which had previously been made into in the 1931 French film of the same title. It was released in the United States by Columbia Pictures.

== Plot ==
George Constantin is a financier, a self-made man who started as a shoeshine boy and is now a financial genius. He dotes on his only daughter Georgette, known as Joy. She falls for a young American reporter who writes an exposé of her father's business affairs. Constantin subsequently discovers that Joy is not really his daughter, and he becomes insane.

Constantin's business partners,Mc Tavish and Fogarty,are extremely nervous about the long-shot business deal they have been backing with their millions--which depends solely on the opinions of one eccentric scientist,Professor Keval. Famous for long-shot successes, Constantin refuses to listen that money is pouring poured down the rabbit hole. It eventually comes down to getting mineral drilling rights in a small Middle East country. When the nation's Shah seems reluctant to grant them COnstantin threatens to make mineral discoveries public and have his country swarmed over by claim jumpers and undesirables. The threat is interrupted when a telegram arrives announcing the engagement of his daughter to the expose' reporter and that Constantin's wife has given them her blessing. Constantin returns home in haste, and to keep her daughter's happiness his wife tells him Joy's real father is Andreas; Constantin's much-abused Major Domo Servant. When his daughter arrives to ask his blessing, Constantin is too catatonic to give a reply. His daughter leaves,taking it as a rejection.

Constantin's wife has decided to stay by him, as it is the first time in their marriage when he has actually needed her.

== Cast ==
- Edward G. Robinson as George Constantin
- Peggy Cummins as Georgette Constantin
- Richard Greene as Larry
- Nora Swinburne as Ava Constantin
- Walter Rilla as Andreas
- Finlay Currie as Sir Thomas McTavish
- James Robertson Justice as Professor Keval
- Ronald Adam as Colonel Fogarty
- David Hutcheson as Annix
- Gregory Ratoff as Marcos
- Peter Illing as Sultan
- Harry Lane as Barboza
- Don Nehan as Polato
- Roberto Villa as Prince Alzar
- Ronald Ward as Doctor Schindler

== Production ==
It was shot at Shepperton Studios and on location in Italy. The film's sets were designed by the art director Andrej Andrejew.

== Reception ==
Kine Weekly wrote: "Platinum finished, plush upholstered melodrama. ... The picture is somewhat larger and a trifle more vivid than life, but its exaggerations, based on a firm foundation, are shrewd and, together with sound acting and skilful direction, contribute to colourful and substantial theatre. Lush staging and photography heighten general effect."

Picture Show wrote: "It is a little sombre but is lightened by the daughter's romance with a young writer, and by touches of comedy. The film is well set and excellently directed, and Edward G. Robinson as the financier whose ruthless desire for power eventually leads to insanity. Peggy Cummins as his daughter, Nora. Swinburne as his wife, and Richard Greene as the young writer, are all good in their respective roles."

Variety wrote: "An obscure story about an international financier, My Daughter Joy, despite its powerful cast, is not going to help the cause of British pictures. It's a vague and insincere piece of entertainment which cannot expect more than moderate returns from the home market, and barely merits a place on the American screens. At no time does the plot seriously attempt to achieve coherency or credulity. Principal characters are etched indefinitely and the underlying theme is never made clear. ... Robinson is virtually wasted. This fine actor tries hard fo bring some semblance of conviction to this unconvincing plot but it's an uphill fight. ...The production is obviously an expensive one with high grade settings and foreign locations. Gregory Ratoff's direction has failed fo make something out of an obviously inadequate script."
