= Suite Française (film) =

2015 film directed by Saul Dibb

- UK release poster
- Directed by: Saul Dibb
- Screenplay by: Saul Dibb; Matt Charman
- Based on: Suite française by Irène Némirovsky
- Produced by: Romain Bramons; Andrea Cornwell; Michael Kuhn; Xavier Marchand
- Starring: Michelle Williams; Kristin Scott Thomas; Matthias Schoenaerts; Sam Riley; Ruth Wilson; Margot Robbie; Lambert Wilson
- Cinematography: Eduard Grau
- Edited by: Chris Dickens
- Music by: Rael Jones
- Production companies: The Weinstein Company; TF1 Films Production; Entertainment One; BBC Films; Qwerty Films
- Distributed by: Entertainment One (United Kingdom); UGC Distribution (France); Kinepolis Film Distribution (Belgium)
- Release dates: 13 March 2015 (United Kingdom); 1 April 2015 (France)
- Running time: 107 minutes
- Countries: United Kingdom; France; Belgium
- Languages: English; German
- Budget: €15 million ($20 million)
- Box office: $9.3 million

Suite Française is a 2015 war romantic drama film directed by Saul Dibb and co-written with Matt Charman. It is based on the second part of Irène Némirovsky's 2004 novel of the same name. The film stars Michelle Williams, Kristin Scott Thomas, Matthias Schoenaerts, Sam Riley, Ruth Wilson, Lambert Wilson and Margot Robbie. It concerns a romance between a French villager and a German soldier during the early years of the German occupation of France during World War II. Suite Française was filmed on location in France and Belgium. It was released theatrically in the UK on 13 March 2015 and premiered in the US through Lifetime cable network on 22 May 2017. The film was nominated for a Primetime Emmy Award for Outstanding Music Composition.

== Plot ==
In German-occupied France, Lucile Angellier and her domineering mother-in-law Madame Angellier await news of her husband Gaston, who was serving in the French Army. While visiting tenants, Lucile and Madame Angellier escape an air raid by German Ju 87 stuka bombers. Following the French surrender, a regiment of German soldiers arrives, and promptly moves into the homes of the villagers.

Wehrmacht Oberleutnant Bruno von Falk, a member of the German nobility, is billeted at the Angelliers' household. Lucile tries to ignore Bruno but is charmed by his gentlemanly demeanor and his piano music. He gives her a piece of the sheet music. Lucile later learns that her husband Gaston's unit has been imprisoned at a German POW camp. Elsewhere, the farmer Benoit and his wife Madeleine chafe under the German officer Kurt Bonnet, who harasses Madeleine. Benoit, who was denied the chance to fight because of his leg wound, hides a rifle. As an act of resistance, he steals the German soldiers' clothes while they are bathing.

When Lucile discovers that one of her mother-in-law's tenants Celine is having sex with a German soldier, Celine reveals that Gaston has been having an extramarital affair and has fathered a girl named Simone. Angry with Madame Angellier for withholding her son's affair, Lucile allows herself to develop romantic feelings for Bruno. At Lucile's request, Bruno confronts Kurt over his harassment. Lucile's relationship with Bruno draws the hostility of many of the townfolk.

The Viscountess de Montmort later catches Benoit stealing a chicken from her coop. When Benoit points a gun at her, she tells her husband, the collaborationist Viscount de Montmort, who sends German soldiers after Benoit. While hiding in a barn, Benoit kills Kurt with his gun and flees into the forest.

The Wehrmacht launches a manhunt and give the townsfolk 48 hours to surrender Benoit. A Wehrmacht Major takes the Viscount hostage and threatens to execute him if Benoit is not found. At Madeleine's request, Lucile hides Benoit in the attic of the Angellier mansion with the help of the reluctant Madame Angellier. Despite a massive manhunt, the Germans fail to capture Benoit and the Viscount is executed by firing squad.

As the Germans plan to withdraw from the town, Lucile takes part in a plan to smuggle Benoit into Paris, where the French Resistance is gathering. She manages to convince Bruno to issue her a travel pass to Paris. However, Bruno's suspicious orderly suspects that Lucile is harboring Benoit and issues special instructions for the checkpoint guards to search her car.

At the checkpoint, Benoit manages to shoot the German soldiers dead with his pistol but is wounded in the shoulder. Bruno arrives on a motorcycle. Lucile faces him with her pistol but is unable to kill him. To Lucile's relief, Bruno instead helps her lift the wounded Benoit into the car and allows them to escape to Paris. As she drives away, Lucile smiles at Bruno in gratitude. Lucile and Benoit later join the French resistance and help liberate France from the Germans. While Lucile later learns that Bruno von Falk perished during the war, she always treasures his musical score Suite Française.

== Cast ==
- Michelle Williams as Lucile Angellier
- Kristin Scott Thomas as Madame Angellier, Lucile Angellier's mother-in-law
- Matthias Schoenaerts as Oberleutnant Bruno Von Falk
- Sam Riley as Benoît Labarie, Madeleine's husband
- Ruth Wilson as Madeleine Labarie, Benoît's wife
- Lambert Wilson as Viscount de Montmort
- Clare Holman as Marthe
- Margot Robbie as Céline Joseph
- Alexandra Maria Lara as Leah, Anna's mother
- Harriet Walter as Viscountess de Montmort
- Eileen Atkins as Denise Epstein
- Tom Schilling as Oberleutnant Kurt Bonnet
- Eric Godon as Monsieur Joseph, Céline's father
- Deborah Findlay as Madame Joseph, Céline's mother
- Diana Kent as Madame Michaud
- Cédric Maerckx as Gaston Angellier, Lucile's husband and Madame Angellier's son

== Production ==
=== Conception and adaptation ===
On 9 November 2006, Michael Fleming from Variety reported that the rights to Irène Némirovsky's novel Suite Française (written during the Nazi occupation of France but published posthumously in 2004) had been acquired by Universal Pictures. Irene was a novelist, murdered during the Holocaust, in Auschwitz. Her works were expected to have been created within the war years reworks Ronald Harwood, who wrote the script for The Pianist, was set to write the screenplay, with Kathleen Kennedy and Frank Marshall producing the film. The following year, TF1 Droits Audiovisuels acquired the rights to the novel from publisher Éditions Denoël. The novel was adapted for the screen by Saul Dibb and Matt Charman, with Dibb directing.

In 2013, the film, produced by France's TF1 Droits Audiovisuels and UK's Entertainment One, was given a budget of €15 million ($20 million). Mick Brown of The Daily Telegraph noted this was "big by European, if not American, standards". In May 2013, it was reported that Suite Française would be a co-production between France, U.K. and Belgium, with Xavier Marchand, Romain Bremond, Michael Kuhn and Andrea Cornwell producing the film along with American Harvey Weinstein of The Weinstein Company serving as the executive producer.

Dibb focused his adaptation on book two of Némirovsky's novels, which explores the relationships between the French women and the German soldiers who occupied their village, in particular the story of Lucile Angellier. She is awaiting news of her husband, who went to war, when a German officer is billeted in her home.

Dibb said

in the making of the film I want to capture this strong sense of immediacy and authenticity. The action should feel that it's happening now – urgent, tense, spontaneous, made with no benefit of hindsight – like we've discovered a time capsule. And very far from a safe, stuffy period piece.

Dibb used the account of the discovery of the manuscript of the novel by Némirovsky's daughter, Denise Epstein, to book-end the film. Némirovsky's original manuscript is shown during the credits. Epstein died shortly before production began, but she read drafts of the script.

=== Casting ===
Variety's Jeff Sneider reported in October 2012 that actress Michelle Williams was in talks to star in Suite Française as the protagonist Lucile Angellier. Shortly after she joined the project, Kristin Scott Thomas was attached to appear as Lucile's "domineering" mother-in-law. In an interview with Moviefone's Erin Whitney, Scott Thomas commented that the character was similar to herself. Actor Matthias Schoenaerts joined the cast as Bruno, a German officer and Lucile's love interest, in November 2012.

On 14 June 2013, Dominic Patten from Deadline Hollywood reported that actor Sam Riley had joined the cast as a French farmer called Benoit. Riley's wife Alexandra Maria Lara also joined the cast, along with fellow actresses Margot Robbie as Celine and Ruth Wilson as Madeleine. Actors Tom Schilling and Lambert Wilson also appear in the film, as Kurt Bonnet and Viscount de Montmort, respectively. Harriet Walter portrays Viscountess de Montmort, while Eileen Atkins appears as Denise Epstein and Cédric Maerckx as Gaston Angellier.

=== Filming ===
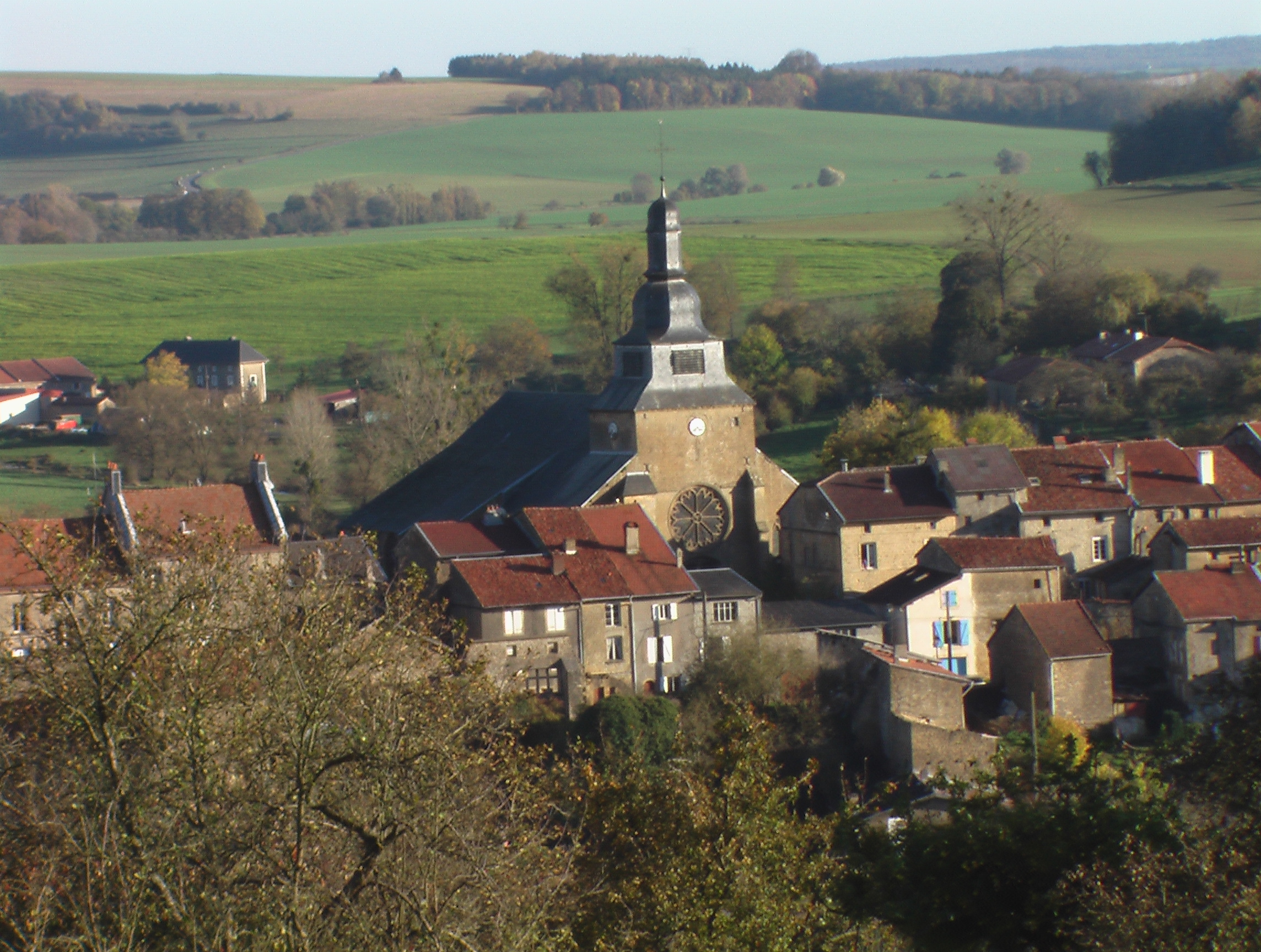
Filming took place in Marville.

Principal photography commenced on 24 June 2013. The shoot lasted until late August. The cast and crew spent eight weeks shooting in Belgium and eight days in France. From 10 July, filming took place in the village of Marville in the Meuse department. In August, the cast and crew spent three and a half weeks filming scenes in a house in Belgium. Dibb commented that the hot weather helped create "its own weird, uncomfortable, claustrophobic atmosphere which you hope is going to feed into the atmosphere of the scenes." Leo Barraclough from Variety reported that principal photography was completed on 2 September 2013.

=== Costumes and make-up ===
English costume designer Michael O'Connor, who previously worked with Dibb on The Duchess, designed and created the clothing for the film. O'Connor used photographs, magazines and movies of the time to make the clothing and accessories as authentic as possible. His major influences were Némirovsky's novel, which describes the clothing in detail, and Jean Renoir's 1939 film The Rules of the Game. The costumes use authentic French fabrics from Paris. The film's countryside setting led Jenny Shircore, the hair and make-up designer for the production, to invoke a sense of sobriety in place of glamor. Shircore used quite little make-up on Williams, who understood she must look quite "natural, simple, in a sense resigned."

=== Music ===
French composer Alexandre Desplat was originally attached to compose the film's musical score. Dibb wanted Bruno's piano piece to be composed before shooting began, and he wanted it to be played during the film as "a developing theme" and then at the end in its full form. Desplat wrote Bruno's Theme, but was unable to write the final score for the entire film and was replaced by Rael Jones. Jones's score was recorded at the Abbey Road Studios in London. Sony Classical released the soundtrack album on 16 March 2015. It features original music composed by Jones, a piano piece composed by Desplat and songs performed by Lucienne Boyer, Josephine Baker and Rosita Serrano. Dibb explained that music plays a crucial part in the film and called the score "subtle and atmospheric."

== Release ==
On 16 April 2013, it was reported that The Weinstein Company had pre-bought the U.S. distribution rights for the film. On 19 May 2013, it was announced that The Weinstein Company would also handle the distribution rights in Latin America, Australia, Russia and Germany, while Entertainment One would release the picture in the U.K., Spain and Canada. The first trailer for the film was released on 24 October 2014.

Suite Française had its world premiere at the Cinema UGC Normandie in Paris on 10 March 2015. The film was originally scheduled to be released theatrically in the UK through Entertainment One on 23 January 2015, but it was postponed to 13 March 2015, and it was released on DVD on 27 July 2015. It was released in France by UGC Distribution on April 20, 2015.

Although it had been acquired by The Weinstein Company, the film did not have a theatrical release in the US. It was scheduled to premiere on Lifetime cable network on 10 October 2016, but the release was postponed to 22 May 2017.

== Reception ==
=== Box office ===
Suite Française earned £503,928 upon its opening weekend in the United Kingdom. The film opened to 425 locations and landed at number four in the UK box office top ten. The following week the film played at a further 21 screens and earned £268,607 for a total of £1,293,408. It fell three places to seven in the box office chart. As of August 2015, Suite Française has earned over $9 million worldwide.

=== Critical reception ===
The film received mostly positive reviews from critics. Review aggregator Rotten Tomatoes reports that 76% of 45 critics have given the film a positive review, with an average rating of 5.94/10. The website's critical consensus states, "Suite Française takes an understated approach to its period romance, which – along with strong performances from a talented cast – pays absorbing dividends." Metacritic assigned a weighted average score of 63 out of 100 based on 8 reviews, indicating "generally favorable reviews".

The Guardian's Peter Bradshaw gave the film two stars out of five and likened the central love story to "a damp haddock on a slab". He continued, "This adaptation of Irène Némirovsky's acclaimed bestseller about French folk collaborating with the Nazis is flabby, sugary – and passion-free." Emma Dibdin from Digital Spy gave the film three stars and commented, "Suite Française works far better as the story of a community in flux than it does as a brooding romance, the shifting loyalties between villagers and soldiers escalating towards a somewhat compelling third act."

Anna Smith from Empire rated the film "good" and said "Sterling performances lift the occasionally soapy storyline in this semi-successful adaptation." Variety's Guy Lodge found the film "fusty but enjoyably old-fashioned", adding "iffy scripting decisions can't thwart the romantic allure of this handsomely crafted, sincerely performed wartime weeper." Writing for The Hollywood Reporter, Leslie Felperin's consensus was "[Suite Française] has sturdy production values, a tony cast and middlebrow tastefulness up the wazoo, but barely any soul, bite or genuine passion."

The "Desire" trailer for Suite Française created by eOne Films International and Create Advertising London earned a nomination for Best Foreign Romance Trailer at the 16th Golden Trailer Awards. Jones's score was nominated for the Public Choice Award at the 2015 World Soundtrack Awards.

== Film postscript ==
The film's postscript reads as follows: Suite Francaise was written in secret as the Nazis occupied France. It was never completed. In 1942 its author, Irene Nemirovsky, was arrested for being Jewish and died in Auschwitz. Her handwritten manuscript lay unread in a suitcase for nearly sixty years until it was discovered by her daughter. Suite Francaise was finally published in 2004 and became a worldwide bestseller. The daughter is quoted as saying:

"It is an extraordinary feeling to have brought my mother back to life. It shows the Nazis did not truly succeed in killing her. It is not vengeance, but it is a victory." - Denise Epstein-Dauple

== Accolades ==
Year	Award	Category	Nominee(s)	Result	Ref.
2015	British Screenwriters' Awards	Outstanding Newcomer for British Feature Film Writing	Matt Charman, Saul Dibb	Nominated	
2015	Golden Trailer Awards	Best Foreign Romance Trailer	Entertainment One, Create Advertising Group	Nominated	
2017	Primetime Emmy Awards	Outstanding Music Composition for a Limited Series, Movie, or Special (Original Dramatic Score)	Rael Jones	Nominated	
2017	Online Film & Television Association	Best Music in a Non-Series	Rael Jones	Nominated	
