= Le Vin de solitude =

Le Vin de solitude, published in English as The Wine of Solitude, is a novel by Ukrainian Jewish author Irène Némirovsky (1903–1942), who was murdered in the Holocaust. (Note: For the author's ethnicity, see Cohen, Patricia (25 April 2010). "Assessing Jewish Identity of Author Killed by Nazis". The New York Times. Archived from the original on 5 November 2015. "Némirovsky, the Russian Jewish author . . . .") It is considered to be partly autobiographical and tells the story of the protagonist, Hélène Karol, who shares much of Némirovsky's early history. Le Vin de solitude was originally published in France in 1935. Following the success of Némirovsky's posthumously published work Suite Française in 2004, it was translated and published in English in 2011.

== Plot ==
Le Vin de solitude tells the story of a dysfunctional middle-class Jewish family living in Kiev, Ukraine during the early years of the 20th century. The father comes from humble origins, but makes a fortune from banking in Imperial Russia. Hélène hates her vain mother, Bella, with an intense but well-hidden passion. As she grows into her teens, the rage increases, fed by her mother's criticisms, extravagance, and lavish, romantic life with her young lover, Max. She pities her absent, gambler father, Boris. She eventually takes revenge on her mother by seducing away her lover, even though she does not actually want him.

At the time of the Russian Revolution, the family flee to Finland and eventually arrive in Paris as émigrés. Hélène has an admiration for France inculcated by her childhood French governess, Mademoiselle Rose.

Hélène's moral integrity in the novel centres on the dawning realisation that the forces which drove her hated mother's behaviour also exist within her and she must transcend them if she is not to repeat the life of her mother.

== Bibliography ==
- The Wine of Solitude (Sandra Smith trans., Chatto & Windus 2011) (1935).
