= All Our Worldly Goods =

1947 novel by Irène Némirovsky

- Author: Irène Némirovsky
- Original title: Les Biens de ce monde
- Translator: Sandra Smith
- Language: French
- Publisher: Éditions Albin Michel
- Publication date: 1 January 1947
- Publication place: France
- English publication date: 2009
- Media type: paperback
- Pages: 268

Les Biens de ce monde (All Our Worldly Goods) is a novel by Irène Némirovsky, published posthumously in 1947 by Éditions Albin Michel. Némirovsky had written the novel before her death in 1942, but it was only after World War II that her works, including this novel, were brought to light and published.

== Plot ==
The story is set in the early 20th century and follows the lives of the Hardelot family, who run a paper mill in the small town of Saint-Elme, France. The novel centers on Pierre Hardelot, who is expected to marry Simone, a woman chosen by his family. However, Pierre is in love with Agnès, a girl from a lower social class. Defying his family’s wishes, Pierre marries Agnès, leading to a series of conflicts and challenges. The narrative spans both World Wars, depicting the impact of these tumultuous times on the Hardelot family and their business.

== Reception ==
In The Guardian the British novelist A.S. Byatt described All Our Worldly Goods as an "extraordinary predecessor" to Némirovsky's later work, the unfinished Suite Française. She noted that Némirovsky had been influenced by Russian writers, as well as French ones like Flaubert and Maupassant.
