= David Golder (film) =

1931 film

- Theatrical film poster
- Directed by: Julien Duvivier
- Written by: Julien Duvivier
- Based on: David Golder by Irène Némirovsky
- Starring: Harry Baur; Paule Andral
- Cinematography: Armand Thirard; Georges Perinal
- Music by: Walter Goehr
- Production company: Vandal et Delac
- Release date: 1931
- Country: France
- Language: French

David Golder is a 1931 French drama film directed by Julien Duvivier and starring Harry Baur, Paule Andral and Jackie Monnier. It is an adaptation of Irène Némirovsky's 1929 novel David Golder, about a self-made Jewish businessman.

== Cast ==
- Harry Baur as David Golder
- Paule Andral as Gloria, his wife
- Jackie Monnier as Joyce, his daughter
- Jean Bradin as Prince Alec, Joyce's fiancé
- Gaston Jacquet as Count Hoyos
- Jean Coquelin as Fischel
- Camille Bert as Tübingen, Golder's Berlin business associate
- Jacques Grétillat as Marcus, Golder's former associate
- Paul Franceschi as Soifer, Golder's friend
- Léon Arvel as doctor
- Charles Dorat as young emigrant
- Nicole Yoghi as nurse

== Bibliography ==
- Williams, Alan Larson (1992). Republic of Images: A History of French Filmmaking. Cambridge, MA: Harvard University Press. ISBN 0674762673. OCLC 24106528.
