= David Golder =

1929 novel by Irène Némirovsky

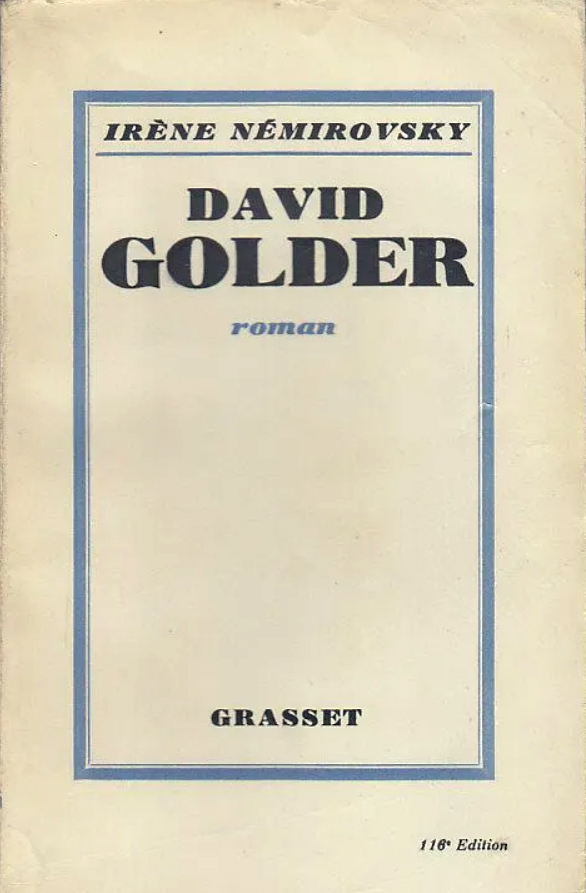
- Author: Irène Némirovsky
- Genre: Novel
- Publication date: 1929
- Publication place: France
- English publication date: 1930
- Media type: Print

David Golder is a 1929 novel by Ukrainian-French writer Irène Némirovsky. David Golder was first published in France in December 1929; the novel, Némirovsky's first, won instant acclaim for the 26-year-old author. An English translation by Sylvia Stuart was published by Horace Liveright in 1930. The book was re-issued in 2004 following the popularity of the Suite Française notebooks discovered in 1998.

== Plot summary ==
The novel opens with David Golder, a Russian émigré, refusing to help his colleague of many years, Marcus. As a result of this, Marcus, bankrupt, commits suicide. Following the funeral, Golder travels to Biarritz where he has a huge, opulent house. His wife, Gloria, and daughter, Joyce, reside there in luxury, spending Golder's cash like water. After a night at the casino winning money to buy Joyce a new car, Golder has a heart attack. Gloria, jealous of the attention Joyce receives from Golder, reveals to him that he is not the true father. All the same, Golder, in order to save Joyce from marrying a rich man that she does not love, returns to Russia to win enough money for Joyce, but dies on the return trip home.

== Major themes ==
The Golder family was based on Némirovsky's own family: David Golder is Némirovsky's father, Léon; Gloria is her mother, Fanny; and Joyce resembles Némirovsky herself in her teenage years.

David Golder is a self-made man. From humble beginnings as a Jew in Ukraine selling rags, he is now a cold, ruthless businessman. It is suggested by his wife, Gloria, that Marcus is not the only casualty of Golder's brutal dealings. However he has an Achilles heel, well hidden: his feckless daughter, Joyce. It is this weakness that eventually ruins him.

Now 68 and dying, he realises that his wealth has not brought him happiness; simply a grim satisfaction that, as "a good Jew" he has provided for his uncaring family. Gloria and Joyce are portrayed as grasping and selfish, barely showing concern or interest in Golder except when they need more money for jewellery, furs, cars and cash for their lovers.

The novel is an astonishing portrayal of a businessman and his family in the years leading up to the Great Depression. It also introduces characters of great depth, like Soifer, the old German Jew who "walks on tiptoe" to save shoe leather; he is Golder's only connection with the old world from which he himself came. His wife, Gloria, is as beautiful, cold and hard as the jewels she so treasures. But it is Joyce, Golder's 18-year-old daughter, who is central to the story. It is she who ultimately causes his ruin.

== Reception ==
The novel met with success from the French public; Jewish critics criticized it for its stereotypical depiction of Jewish people.

In 1930, the novel was made into a film directed by Julien Duvivier and starring Harry Baur as the title character.

In March 2010, the book was dramatised in five episodes on BBC Radio 4, with David Suchet as David Golder. It was directed by Peter Farago.

== Autobiographical ==
Nemirovsky's mother, "Fanny," whom Irene loathed, had two things in her safe when she died in 1972, copies of her daughter's novels Jezebel and David Golder.

== See also ==
- The Dogs and the Wolves
