= Jonathan M. Weiss =

American scholar

Jonathan Weiss
- Born: May 3, 1942 (age 84); New Britain, Connecticut, U.S.
- Education: Columbia University (BA); Yale University (PhD)
- Occupations: Professor; biographer; author; academic administrator; interpreter
- Spouse: Dace Weiss

Jonathan Mark Weiss (born May 3, 1942) is an American scholar of French literature and social science whose extensive publications include literary and theatre criticism, essays on Franco-American relations, a short story, and most recently the biography of Irène Némirovsky.

Weiss is currently NEH Class of 1940 Distinguished Professor of Humanities, emeritus, in the Department of French and Italian at Colby College in Waterville, Maine. Weiss currently lives in Dijon, France, with his wife, Dace.

== Biography ==
Weiss was born in New Britain, Connecticut. He received his B.A. from Columbia College in 1964, and his Ph.D. from Yale University in 1973. From 1967 to 1968 Weiss had a Fulbright Fellowship for research in France. In 1977 and again in 1979, he had a Canadian Government fellowship for research in Quebec. He was also granted in 1979 another Fulbright Fellowship for research this time in Quebec.

In the mid-1960s Weiss worked as an interpreter for the United States State Department during which time he interpreted for, among others, Martin Luther King Jr. for francophone African dignitaries. From 1969 to 1972 Weiss was a lecturer in French at the University of Warwick, Coventry, England. From 1972 to 2007 he was an instructor, assistant professor, associate professor, and full professor of French at Colby College. He was granted tenure in 1978 and was promoted to full professor in 1986. Weiss served as chair of the modern foreign languages department from 1982 to 1985, he was also the director of Off-Campus Study and Academic Affairs from 1990 to 1997, and Associate Dean of Faculty from 1997 to 2000. In September 2000 he was awarded the NEH endowed chair. During his tenure as director of off-campus study, Weiss established programs of study in Dijon, France, and London, England, the latter a joint program with Bowdoin and Bates colleges. Weiss continues to direct the Dijon program.

In his authored works, Weiss typically writes in French or English depending on his audience. His recent Némirovsky biography was written in French and published in France before being translated into English by his wife for publication in the United States. Irène Némirovsky was a prolific Russian-born French writer of fiction who published her novels and short stories in Paris until she was deported to Auschwitz.

== Selected bibliography ==
=== Books ===
- Irène Némirovsky. Paris: Éditions du Félin, 2005. ISBN 2-86645-599-1
- Irène Némirovsky: Her Life and Works. Stanford: Stanford University Press, 2007. ISBN 978-0-8047-5481-1
- French-Canadian Theater. Boston: Twayne Publishers (bought by Macmillan); May 1986.
- French-Canadian Literature. Washington, DC: The Association for Canadian Studies in the United States, 1989. Reprinted by the Michigan State University Press, 1995.
- Essays on French-Canadian Theater (Editor, with Joseph Donohoe). East Lansing: Michigan State University Press, 1995. Winner of the ACSUS award for best book of essays on Canada, 1996.

=== Recent articles ===
- "Arthur Buies et les Etats-Unis au XIXe siècle" Québec Studies, 1987, p. 89–99.
- "Une lecture américaine de Volkswagen Blues," Études françaises, vol. 21, no. 3 (Winter 1985–86), p. 89–96.
- "Le théâtre québécois: une histoire de famille," inle Théâtre au Québec, mémoire et appropriation, Montréal: Société d’Histoire du Théâtre du Québec, 1990, p. 131–140.
- "Le Premier Mouvement: un roman américain?," Études françaises, 26:2, 1990, p. 21–29.
- "Le Centenaire de la Révolution Française dans la presse américaine," Littérature et nation, 2:3, September 1990, p. 135–149.
- "Jacques Poulin, lecteur de Hemingway," Études françaises, 1993, 11–22.
- "À Rome comme à Dijon: Le Président de Brosses en Italie," in Le XVIIIe siècle : histoire, mémoire et rêve. Mélanges offerts à Jean Goulemot, Paris: Honoré Champion, 2006. ISBN 2-7453-1332-0.

=== Fiction ===
- "Christmas" (a short story), in Escala, December 2001.

=== Recent papers given ===
- "Les Origines de la Francophobie américaine," France-Amérique Bourgogne Association, Dijon, March 9, 2004.
- "Le Personnage théâtral," Université de Bourgogne (école doctorale), March 9, 2004
- "From 'The French Monster' to 'Cheese Eating Surrender Monkeys': Two Centuries of Francophobia in the United States", Society for French Historical Studies, Paris, June 18, 2004
- "Table ronde - Trois destins singuliers: Romain Gary, Maurice Sachs, Irène Némirovsky," Institut Mémoire de l’Édition Contemporaine, Caen (France), May 21, 2005.
- "Liberté, fraternité, judéophobie: American reactions to perceived French anti-Semitism," Symposium on The French in the United States, University of Texas at Austin, April 22, 2005.

=== Plays produced at Colby College ===
- The Caucasian Chalk Circle (Brecht), January 1973
- La Leçon (Ionesco), December 2002
- La Leçon du mardi (play written by French major Allison McAnney), April 2003
- La Cantatrice chauve (Ionesco), April 2004
