= Yellow Tapers for Paris =

1943 book by Bruce Marshall

- First edition
- Author: Bruce Marshall
- Cover artist: Elias
- Language: English
- Published: Constable 1943
- Publication place: United Kingdom (Scotland)
- Media type: Print (hardback)
- Pages: 294

Yellow Tapers for Paris is a 1943 novel by Scottish writer Bruce Marshall.

== Plot summary ==
The crushing 1940 defeat of France (an event the author lived through) is the subject of this novel. Marshall implies that France lost its soul and was itself more responsible for its defeat than Germany.

We meet Bigou, the protagonist, in 1934. He is an honest, hard-working, but irreligious and immoral accountant, employed by a successful industrial firm in Paris. He is mildly troubled that his firm expends considerable effort conniving to avoid paying its legitimate taxes. Conversations with accountants and employees of other companies lead Bigou to realize that most of the business enterprises of the time in France are behaving similarly,

The novel gives us a picture of Bigou's life. The reader is introduced to his family; sulky, plucky daughter Odette and sickly wife Marie; friends, his coworkers and other people he meets in his business life. The author endeavors to show that money and pleasure were the main goals sought with any sincerity. Even religion, when it did exist, wasn't much more than an outward display. Bigou does come to believe that the local priest is one of the few people he knows who exhibits integrity.

The "petit bourgeois" in the novel are shabby and bewildered as they assist helplessly at their nation's funeral, but they stand in brilliant contrast to the insatiable greed and craftiness of the wealthy.

Marshall clearly believes that France lost its virtue, especially among its elites. He even implies that the leaders of the Church were more interested in status and materialism than spirituality. The novel indicates that the common people, deprived of the just rewards of their labor, and without worthy spiritual direction, became trapped in immorality, and were spiritually and physically impoverished.

== Symbolism ==
Yellow tapers, or yellow candles, are used in Catholic funeral services.

== Yellow Tapers for Paris and Suite Française ==
Some readers have noticed similarities between Marshall's 1943 novel Yellow Tapers for Paris and Irène Némirovsky's Suite Française which was written at about the same time, but not discovered until 1998.

There is no suggestion of plagiarism—Némirovsky had been murdered before Marshall's novel was published and no one saw Némirovsky's work before its 1998 discovery.

The stories cover the leadup to the Nazi Invasion and its immediate aftermath, but the events of the respective stories are much different. Marshall's ends before the occupation, while Némirovsky's has significant portions devoted to it. Both works have major characters who work in the financial field—Marshall's protagonist is a financial accountant while Némirovsky's work has major characters who work for a bank.

Both books were written during and/or immediately after the actual period itself, but show considerable reflection—they aren't just "diary" entries. Even more remarkable considering the activities of the authors at the time—Némirovsky struggling to evade the Nazis and protect her two daughters and Marshall working for the British Army.

There are also remarkable parallels in the two writers' lives.

They were close in age, Marshall was born in 1899 and Némirovsky in 1903.

Both were converts to Catholicism.

Both authors were parents of similar aged daughters—the birthdate of Marshall's daughter, Sheila, is not available, but her husband was born in 1927. One would assume that she was close to the same age as Némirovsky's oldest daughter, Denise, who was born in 1929.

Both writers were expatriates living in Paris at the same time (sometime in the early 1920s until the Nazi invasion). Both were successful writers, and lived in a place, Paris, during a time when writers were greatly celebrated. However, there is no evidence that Némirovsky and Marshall ever met.

Marshall worked for a financial accounting firm while Némirovsky's family was in banking.

Both were well-established and prolific novelists at the time of the invasion—Némirovsky's first novel was published in 1927, and she had published about 14 novels by 1940. Marshall's first was in 1924 and he had published about 15 novels by 1940.

Both fled the Nazi invasion and wrote novels partly based on those experiences.
