= Susan Rubin Suleiman =

Hungarian-born American scholar of French literature

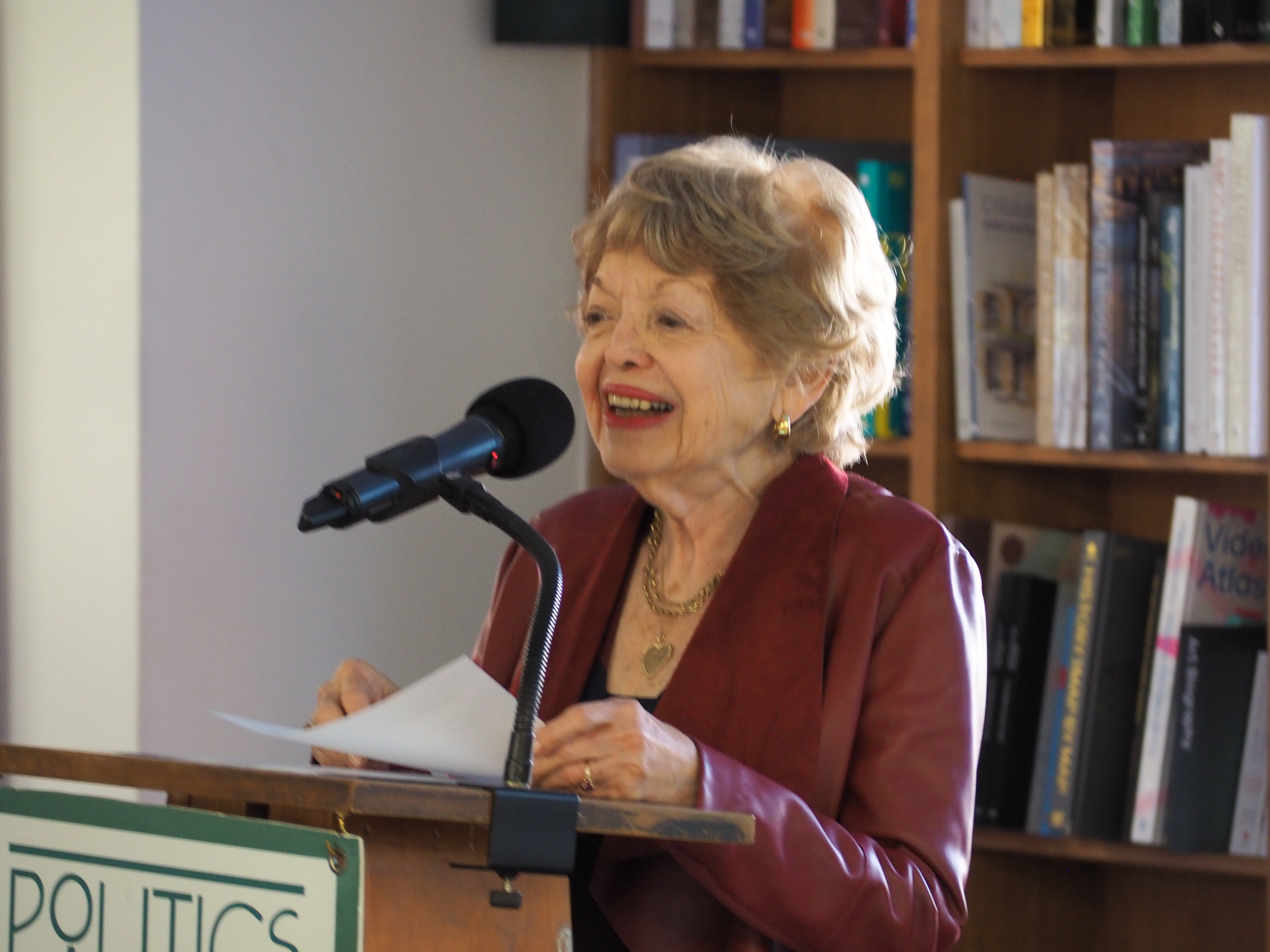
- Awards: Guggenheim Fellowship (1987) Radcliffe Medal for Distinguished Achievement (1990) Légion d'honneur (2018)

Academic background
- Education: Barnard College (BA); Harvard University (PhD)

Academic work
- Discipline: French literature
- Institutions: Columbia University; Occidental College; Harvard University

Susan Rubin Suleiman is a Hungarian-born American literary scholar. She is the C. Douglas Dillon Professor Emerita of the Civilization of France and Professor Emerita of Comparative Literature at Harvard University.

== Biography ==
Suleiman was born in Budapest and emigrated to the United States as a child with her parents. She received her B.A. from Barnard College and a PhD from Harvard University. She taught at Columbia University and Occidental College, before joining the faculty of Harvard University in 1981, where was a professor until her retirement in 2015. She has served as the chair of Harvard's Department of Romance Language and Literature, as well as chair of Harvard's Department of Literature and Comparative Literature. Her scholarship has focused on the contemporary literature and culture of France, including the life and works of novelist Irène Némirovsky.

Suleiman received a Guggenheim Fellowship in 1987. She was named an officer of the Ordre des Palmes académiques in 1992 by the French government. In 2018, she was awarded France's highest honor, the Légion d'Honneur.
