= Le Bal (novella) =

- Author: Irène Némirovsky
- Language: French
- Genre: Novella
- Publication date: 1929/1931
- Publication place: France
- Media type: Print

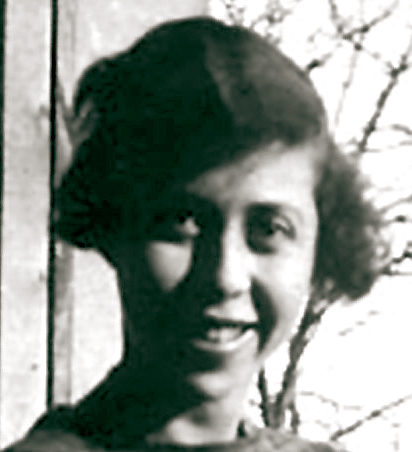
Irène Nemirovsky at the age of 25 years old.

Le Bal is the title of collection of 2 novellas written by Irène Némirovsky. Published in France in 1929, it has been recently re-issued, due to the increasing interest in and popularity of the author's work, following the discovery and publication of Suite Française.

Le Bal is a short novella about a German Jewish family living in Paris; Snow in Autumn is a poignant tale of Russian emigres fleeing to France following the Bolshevik Revolution.

It was made into a film in 1931.

== Le Bal ==
Le Bal, which was made into a film when first published, tells the story of a young girl, Antoinette Kampf, who lives with her parents in an opulent apartment in Paris. Their lifestyle was not always like this; the father had to work hard to amass his fortune, but he was determined to succeed. She has a difficult relationship with her mother, Rosine. The latter has a shady past, with implications of promiscuity and perhaps a hint of prostitution, and is quite as determined as her husband to be accepted into French high society. The desire for acceptance reflects the fact that Kampf is Jewish and the family is nouveau riche. To this end they plan a ball. Although they intend to invite all the titled and the rich of Paris with whom they have the least acquaintance, the discussion of whom to invite makes it clear that the guest list will include many people with pasts and origins as questionable as their own. They spend a great deal of money on food, musicians, flowers and champagne. For Rosine, all must be perfect. The daughter is thrilled at the prospect, but her mother has no intention of letting her go to the bal. She sees the event as a last chance of wish fulfillment and her perfectionism demonstrates both her social insecurity as an arriviste and her psychological insecurity as someone trying to make the dreams of her years of poverty come true. Her teenage daughter's attending the ball would change the event, turning her into a middle-aged woman, rather than the fantasy of youth and being courted by a young lover. Antoinette feels betrayed by her mother, and by her English governess, Miss Betty, who is seeing a young man secretly. Finally, Antoinette makes a decision that will wreak a terrible revenge upon her mother. At the end of the story the outcome of events has left Rosine Kampf isolated and weakened, while Antoinette is able to address her in terms that echo her mother's earlier mode of address to her.

== Snow in Autumn ==
Snow in Autumn is told from the perspective of an elderly servant of an aristocratic Russian family. Having raised generations of the household's children, she watches the family's young men leave to fight in the war.

Following the revolution, she stays in the house, and awaits the family's return. However, they flee to Paris, except the youngest, who, on his return to the old family home is shot dead by his former friend. Traumatised, Tatiana must join the family in Paris to tell them of the son's death. She stays on with them, but she, unlike the younger members of the family, cannot adapt to the cramped and poverty-stricken life they lead there. She becomes sad and introspective, longing for the cold, icy winters of Russia. It is a poignant tale, made more resonant by the fact that Nemirovsky herself had to flee Russia with her family.
