= Gringoire (newspaper) =

French newspaper

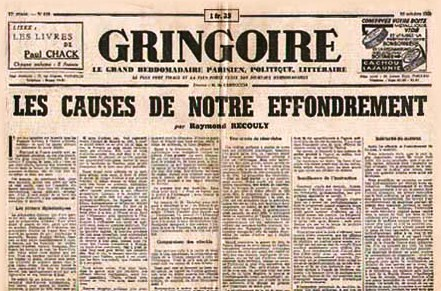
Typical cover of Gringoire.

Gringoire (French pronunciation: [ɡʁɛ̃ɡwaʁ]) was a political and literary weekly newspaper in France, founded in 1928 by Horace de Carbuccia (son-in-law of Jean Chiappe, the prefect of police involved in the Stavisky Affair), Georges Suarez and Joseph Kessel.

It was one of the great inter-war weekly French papers, following a formula started by Candide, and taken up not only by Gringoire but also by the left-wing papers Vendredi and Marianne. The style involved according significant space to politics, having a high-quality literature page, having grand reportages and grand feuilletons (in this case with Pierre Drieu La Rochelle and Francis Carco), satirical cartoons (the main illustrator of Gringoire was Roger Roy), and a simple presentation.

== From the centre-right to right-wing nationalism ==
At the outset Gringoire was a pamphlet, the principal trait of a paper called a macédoine (mish-mash), a term coined by Carbuccia himself. Marxism and the left in general were its favourite targets. It represented the right-wing spectrum of the Union nationale led by Raymond Poincaré, with a veteran-like style which it retained throughout.

After the 6 February 1934 shooting of veterans of the First World War, following the general trend toward radicalisation, the influence of Action française made itself felt. In October 1935, Gringoire declared itself against the international sanctions imposed on Italy following its invasion of Abyssinia to avoid pushing Mussolini toward an alliance with Hitler. For a long time, the paper had shown itself favourable to the Italian regime, as well as to the Salazar regime in Portugal. It also developed an increasingly marked Anglophobia. Henri Béraud, the paper's editor, published in the 11 October 1935 issue a humoristic article titled "Do we have to reduce England to slavery?". From 1930 the paper, was Germanophobe and nationalist. Its special correspondent in Germany, Xavier de Hauteclocque, forcefully denounced the Nazi régime.

Initially favorable to a military intervention against Germany, by 1938 Gringoire was hostile to war because of the perceived weakness of the French military in the face of growing militarism in Germany.

The novelist Romain Gary who published two novels in Gringoire: The Storm (15 February 1935) and A Small Woman (24 May 1935), under his real name Roman Kacew. When the journal, "having turned strongly to the right, then to the extreme-right" became hostile to Jewish immigration, Gary stopped sending his writings despite the significant compensation he received, of 1000 francs per 6-column page.

In his essay on William Butler Yeats, George Orwell cites the predominance of advertising by clairvoyants in Gringoire as an example of the affinity of mysticism with right-wing politics. Elsewhere, Orwell named the paper as "the most disgusting rag it is possible to imagine."

== From nationalism to Vichyism ==
From 1936 onwards, a second radicalisation took place, involving a convergence of anti-war views and a vitriolic hostility to the left. People who espoused war were deemed by extension communist sympathisers. Gringoire took editorial positions viewed as anti-semitic while simultaneously welcoming journalists who were Jewish or of Jewish descent such as Joseph Kessel and Irene Nemirovsky. Jews were accused of wanting war in order to overthrow the Nazi regime (which Gringoire also criticized) at a time of French military weakness. Certain Jews were also denounced as the supreme agents of communism in France, and favoured immigration, despised by Gringoire as a source of problems.

The Popular Front of France and the Popular Front of Spain were excoriated by Gringoire. André Tardieu was the editorial writer from 1936 to 1939; when he had a stroke, Philippe Henriot and Roland Dorgelès joined the editorship.

In the 1930s, Gringoire was widely appreciated—to the same extent as Candide, L'Action française and Je suis partout—in right-wing Romanian circles. It sold excellently in Bucharest.

Gringoire approved the Munich Accords, which provoked a fight between Tardieu (who opposed the accords) and Béraud (who was in favour). In spring 1939, Gringoire criticised the 1938 invasion of Czechoslovakia by Germany, and from July 1939 to May 1940, rallied to the politics of national defence. Its tone changed after the defeat; Gringoire, allying with the Vichy regime, fully approved the armistice and Philippe Pétain's national revolution. However, while some of the journalists were ideologically collaborationists, Carbuccia was, according to Pascal Ory, in favour of strategic collaboration and sought to protect his Jewish and resistant journalists. He stopped the newspaper's circulation on 25 May 1944.

Among the paper's contributors was Irène Némirovsky, a politically conservative ethnic Jew of Russian origin who had converted to Catholicism. After the war started, Gringoire was the only magazine that continued to publish her work, pseudonymously, thus "guarantee[ing] Némirovsky's family some desperately needed income." She was arrested in 1942 by the French gendarmerie and handed over to the Nazis; she died of typhus a month after her arrest.

Gringoire's military correspondent, Henri Pelle-Desforges joined the resistance. He was arrested by the Germans and sent to the Buchenwald concentration camp where he died in 1944.

== Principal sources ==
- Jacques Julliard and Michel Winock (dir.), Dictionnaire des intellectuels français, ed. du Seuil, 2002
- Pascal Ory, Les Collaborateurs, ed. du Seuil, « Points »-histoire, 1980
- Eugen Weber, L'Action française, ed. Fayard, 1985 et Hachette, coll. « Pluriel », 1990
- Horace de Carbuccia, Le massacre de la victoire, ed. de Paris, 2015.
- https://www.lefigaro.fr/actualite-france/2018/07/17/01016-20180717ARTFIG00268-les-heros-anonymes-xavier-de-hauteclocque-au-champ-d-honneurdes-journalistes.php
