= André Chaumeix =

French academician, journalist, and literary critic

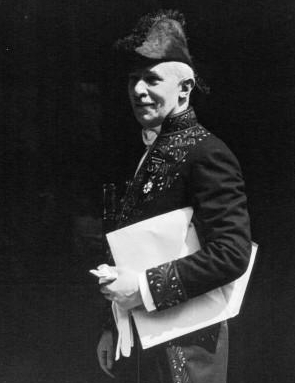

André Chaumeix (6 June 1874, Chamalières, Puy-de-Dôme – 23 February 1955) was a French academician, journalist, and literary critic. He was the fourteenth member elected to occupy seat 3 of the Académie française in 1930.

He was elected member of the French Academy on 22 May 1930 in the chair of Georges Clemenceau. He acquired a great influence there, making and unmaking elections. With the advent of the Vichy regime in 1940, André Chaumeix, along with the majority of academics, became a supporter of Marshal Pétain and of state collaboration. In 1941, he wrote a programmatic article in the Revue des deux mondes in favor of the National Revolution: "[Petain] wanted to revive the healthy customs (...) that a senseless policy had banished for forty years and more. He endorsed in choice terms the brand-new policy of collaboration announced at Montoire: "France is an indispensable part of Europe (...) No one knows what the future world will be. It is possible that we will have to fulfill a useful and active mission. We will only fulfill it if we are a renewed nation".

In the Maurrasian press, he then wrote to contribute to the work of "national renovation" by maintaining the pure French style, to stigmatize democracy, "the regime of ease," with monarchist accents, and the writers of the Enlightenment and the Romantics who had become involved in the political debate. In these writings mixing literary and political considerations, he frequently quotes Maurras.
