= Myriam Anissimov =

French writer

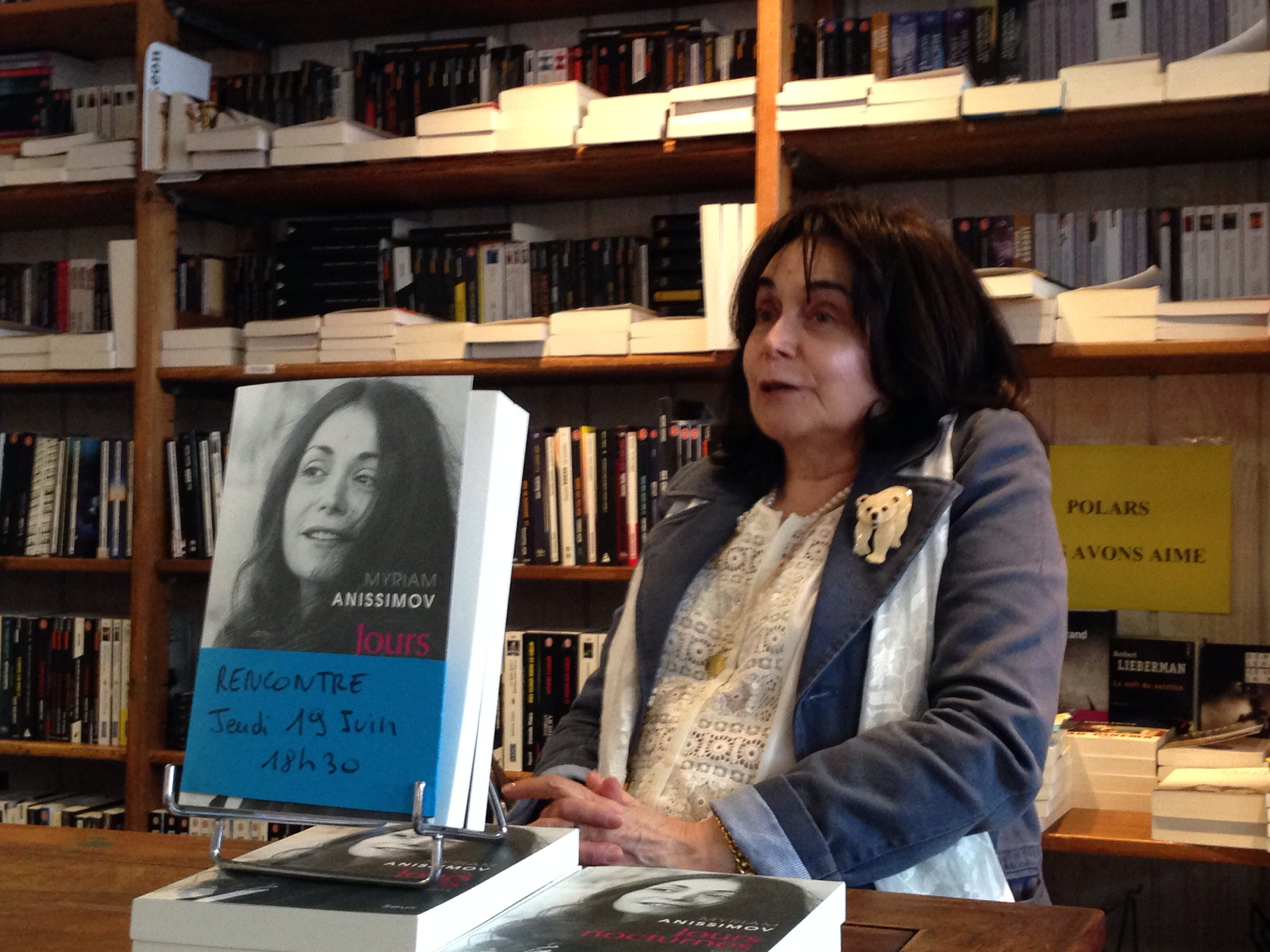
- Myriam Anissimov reading at the Folies d'Encre boosktore, Montreuil, June 2014
- Born: 1943 (age 82–83); Sierre, Switzerland
- Occupations: Writer, journalist
- Writing career
- Genres: Fiction, journalism, young adult

Myriam Anissimov (born 1943 in Sierre, Switzerland) is a French writer.

She is the author of several biographies, including of Primo Levi, Tragedy of an Optimist (Overlook Press) and Romain Gary, as well as many novels and a book for young adults.

Anissimov wrote the preface to the first French publication of Suite Francaise, the publication of which led to Némirovsky's posthumous fame. Denise Epstein, Némirovsky's daughter, first approached Anissimov with the manuscripts which she was planning to donate to an archive, when Anissimov urged her to submit them for publication instead, and put her in contact with Olivier Rubinstein, head of Denoël.

Anissimov has described herself as "A Yiddish writer in French".

== Prizes and honors ==
Myriam Anissimov has received four grants from the National Center for Letters, the prize of the Anaïs-Segalas Foundation of the French Academy in 1983 for La Marida, the Jean-Freustié prize in 200 for her novel Sa majesté la mort, as well as the Roland-de-Jouvenel Prize of the French Academy in 2018 for her novel Les Yeux bordés de reconnaissance.

She has been a member of the order of Arts and Letters since 1992.
