= Irène Némirovsky =

French novelist (1903–1942)

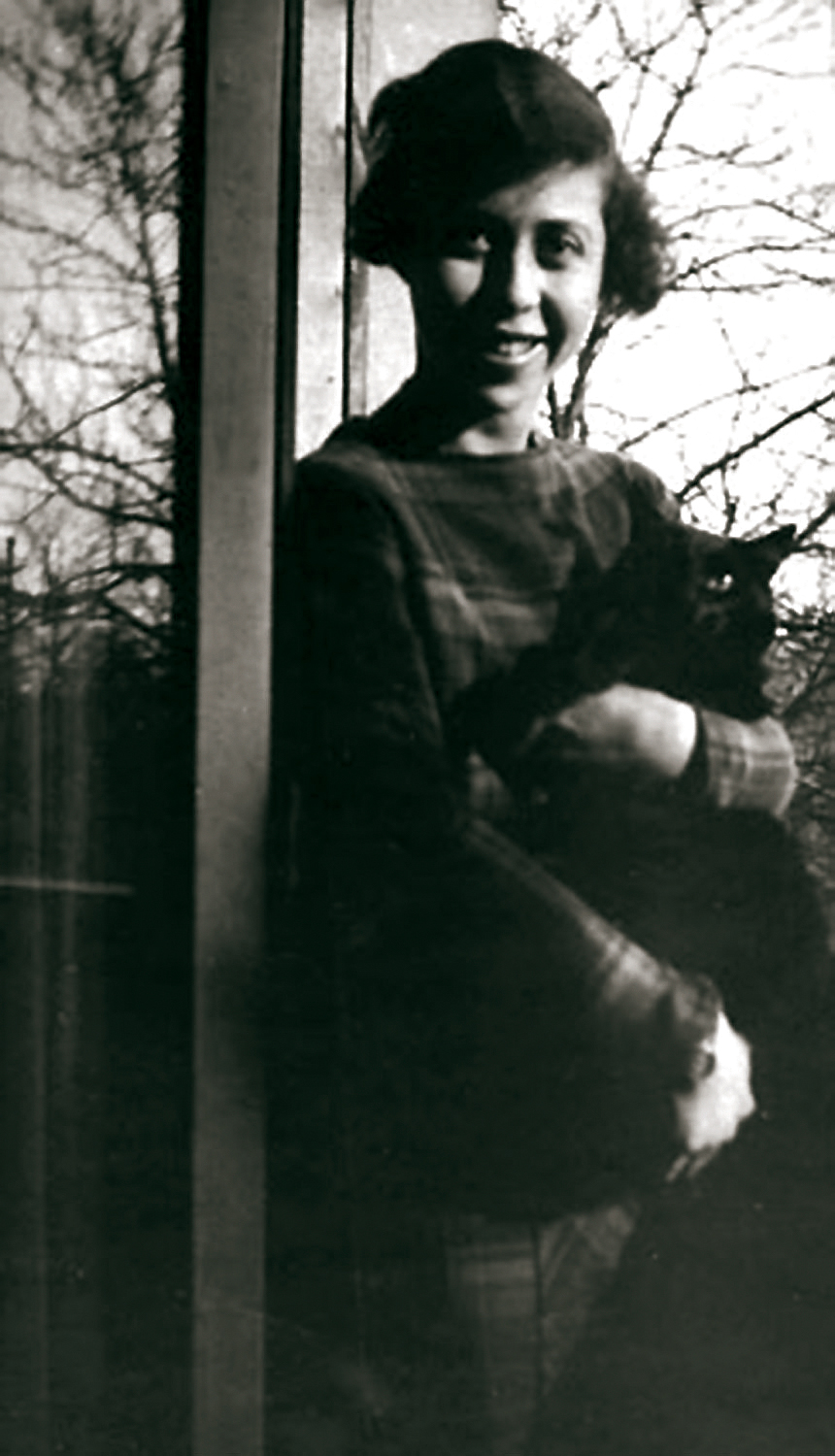
- Némirovsky c. 1928
- Born: Irina Lvovna Nemirovskaya; 11 February 1903; Kiev, Kiev Governorate, Russian Empire
- Died: 17 August 1942 (aged 39); Auschwitz-Birkenau, Upper Silesia, German-occupied Poland
- Resting place: Oświęcim, Poland
- Occupation: Novelist
- Spouse: Michel Epstein
- Children: 2
- Writing career
- Notable work: Suite française
- Movement: Modernism

Irène Némirovsky (French: [iʁɛn nemiʁɔfski]; born Irina Lvovna Nemirovskaya; (Note: Russian: Ири́на Льво́вна Неми́ровская, IPA: [ɪˈrʲinə ˈlʲvovnə nʲɪˈmʲirəfskəjə]; Ukrainian: Іри́на Льві́вна Немиро́вська, IPA: [iˈrɪnɐ ˈlʲwiu̯nɐ nemɪˈrɔu̯sʲkɐ].) 11 February 1903 – 17 August 1942) was a novelist of Ukrainian Jewish origin who was born in Kiev, then in the Russian Empire. She lived more than half her life in France and wrote in French, but was denied French nationality. Arrested as a Jew under the racial laws – which did not take into account her conversion to Roman Catholicism – she died in Auschwitz at the age of 39. Némirovsky is best known for the posthumously published Suite française.

== Life and career ==
Irina Lvovna Nemirovskaya was born in 1903 in Kiev, then Russian Empire, the daughter of a wealthy banker, Lev (later Léon) Borisovich Nemirovsky. Her volatile and unhappy relationship with her mother Fanni Yonovna Margolis Nemirovskya became the heart of many of her novels.

Her family fled the Russian Empire at the start of the Russian Revolution in 1917, spent 1918 in Finland, and then settled in Paris, where Némirovsky attended the Sorbonne and began writing when she was 18 years old.

In 1926, Némirovsky married Michel Epstein, a wealthy banker, and had two daughters: Denise, born in 1929; and Élisabeth, in 1937.

In 1929, she published David Golder, the story of a wealthy Jewish banker unable to please his troubled daughter. It was an immediate success, and was adapted to the big screen by Julien Duvivier in 1930, with Harry Baur as David Golder. In 1930, her novel Le Bal, the story of a mistreated daughter and the revenge of a teenager, became a play and a movie.

The David Golder manuscript was sent by post to the publishing company Éditions Grasset with a poste restante address and signed Epstein. H. Muller, a reader for Grasset, immediately tried to find the author but failed, so Grasset advertised in newspapers for the author's identity. However, she was busy bearing her first child, Denise. When Némirovsky finally appeared as the author of David Golder, the unverified story is that the publisher was surprised that such a young woman was able to write such a powerful book.

Although she was widely recognized as a major author – even by some anti-Semitic writers like Robert Brasillach – French nationality was denied to the Némirovskys in 1938.

Némirovsky was of Russian-Jewish origin, but was baptized into the Roman Catholic Church in 1939 and wrote in Candide and Gringoire, two magazines with ultra-nationalist tendencies. After the war started, Gringoire was the only magazine that continued to publish her work, thus "guarantee[ing] Némirovsky's family some desperately needed income".

By 1940, Némirovsky's husband was unable to continue working at the bank, and Némirovsky's books could no longer be published, because of her Jewish ancestry. Upon the Nazis' approach to Paris, they fled with their two daughters to the village of Issy-l'Évêque (the Némirovskys initially sent them to live with their nanny's family in Burgundy, while staying on in Paris themselves; they had already lost their Russian home and refused to lose their home in France), where Némirovsky was required to wear the yellow star.

On 13 July 1942 (three days before the start of the Vel' d'Hiv Roundup), Némirovsky (then 39) was arrested in front of her daughters as a "stateless person of Jewish descent" by policemen employed by Vichy France. As she was being taken away, she told her daughters, "I am going on a journey now." She was brought to a convoy assembly camp at Pithiviers, and on 17 July 1942, together with 928 other Jewish deportees, transported to the Nazi concentration camp Auschwitz, in Poland. Upon her arrival there two days later, her forearm was marked with an identification number. She died a month later of typhus. On 6 November 1942, her husband, Michel Epstein, was sent to Auschwitz and immediately murdered in the gas chambers.

== Rediscovery ==
Némirovsky is now best known as the author of the unfinished Suite française (Denoël, France, 2004, ISBN 2-207-25645-6; translation by Sandra Smith, Knopf, 2006, ISBN 1-4000-4473-1), two novellas portraying life in France between 4 June 1940 and 1 July 1941, the period during which the Nazis occupied most of France. These works are considered remarkable because they were written during the actual period itself and yet are the product of considered reflection, rather than just a journal of events, as might be expected considering the personal turmoil experienced by the author at the time.

Némirovsky's older daughter, Denise, kept the notebook containing the manuscript for Suite française for fifty years without reading it, thinking it was a journal or diary of her mother's, which would be too painful to read. In the late 1990s, however, she made arrangements to donate her mother's papers to a French archive and decided to examine the notebook first. Upon discovering what it contained, she instead had it published in France, where it became a bestseller in 2004. It sold 2.5 million copies by 2008 and has been translated into 38 languages.

The original manuscript has been given to the Institut mémoires de l'édition contemporaine (IMEC), and the novel has won the Prix Renaudot – the first time the prize has been awarded posthumously.

Némirovsky's surviving notes sketch a general outline of a story arc that was intended to include the two existing novellas, as well as three more to take place later during the war and at its end. She wrote that the rest of the work was "in limbo, and what limbo! It's really in the lap of the gods since it depends on what happens."

In a January 2006 interview with the BBC, her daughter Denise said, "For me, the greatest joy is knowing that the book is being read. It is an extraordinary feeling to have brought my mother back to life. It shows that the Nazis did not truly succeed in killing her. It is not vengeance, but it is a victory."

== Controversy ==
Several reviewers and commentators have raised questions regarding Némirovsky's conversion to Catholicism, her generally negative depiction of Jews in her writing and her use of ultra-nationalist publications to provide for her family.

Myriam Anissimov's introduction to the French edition of Suite française describes Némirovsky as a "self-hating Jew", due to the fact that Némirovsky's own situation as a Jew in France is not at all seen in the work. The paragraph was omitted from the English edition.

A long article in The Jewish Quarterly argued that there had been an "abdication of critical responsibility in exchange for the more sensational copy to be had from Némirovsky’s biography" by most reviewers in the British press.

== Fire in the Blood ==
In 2007, another novel by Némirovsky was published, after a complete manuscript was found in her archives by two French biographers. Chaleur du sang – translated to English by Sandra Smith as Fire in the Blood – is a tale of country folk in a Burgundy village, based on Issy-l'Évêque where Némirovsky and her family found temporary refuge while hiding from the Nazis.

== Works ==
=== Published during the author's life ===
- L'Enfant génial (Éditions Fayard, 1927). Was renamed by the publisher L'enfant prodige in 1992 with the approval of Némirovsky's daughters, because the French term génial had become widely used in slang (similar to awesome) and no longer had the same connotations.
- David Golder (Éditions Grasset, 1929). David Golder, trans. Sylvia Stuart (1930); also trans. Sandra Smith (2007).
- Le Bal (Éditions Grasset, 1930). Trans. Sandra Smith in Le Bal / Snow in Autumn (2007)
- Le malentendu (Éditions Fayard, 1930)
- Les Mouches d'automne (Éditions Grasset, 1931). Trans. Sandra Smith in Le Bal / Snow in Autumn (2007)
- L'Affaire Courilof (Éditions Grasset, 1933). The Courilof Affair, trans. Sandra Smith (2008)
- Le Pion sur l'échiquier (Éditions Albin Michel, 1934)
- Films parlés (Éditions Nouvelle Revue Française, 1934)
- Le Vin de solitude (Éditions Albin Michel, 1935). The Wine of Solitude, trans. Sandra Smith (Vintage, 2012).
- Jézabel (Éditions Albin Michel, 1936). A Modern Jezebel, trans. Barre Dunbar (Henry Holt & Co., 1937); also as Jezebel, trans. Sandra Smith (Vintage, 2010).
- La Proie (Éditions Albin Michel, 1938)
- Deux (Éditions Albin Michel, 1939)
- Le maître des âmes (Revue Gringoire, 1939, published as weekly episodes). Master of Souls, trans. Sandra Smith (2022)
- Les Chiens et les loups (Éditions Albin Michel, 1940). The Dogs and the Wolves, trans. Sandra Smith (2009)

=== Works published posthumously ===
- La Vie de Tchekhov (Éditions Albin Michel, 1946)
- Les Biens de ce monde (Éditions Albin Michel, 1947). All Our Worldly Goods, trans. Sandra Smith (Vintage, 2011).
- Les Feux de l'automne (Éditions Albin Michel, 1957). The Fires of Autumn, trans. Sandra Smith (2014).
- Dimanche (short stories) (Éditions Stock, 2000). Dimanche and Other Stories, trans. Bridget Patterson (Persephone Books, 2010)
- Destinées et autres nouvelles (Éditions Sables, 2004)
- Suite française (Éditions Denoël, 2004). Suite Française, trans. Sandra Smith (Chatto & Windus, 2004; Alfred A. Knopf, 2006).
- Le maître des âmes (Éditions Denoël, 2005)
- Chaleur du sang (Éditions Denoël, 2007). Fire in the Blood, trans. Sandra Smith (Chatto & Windus, 2007, ISBN 9780701181833)
- Les vierges et autres nouvelles, Éditions Denoël, 2009

=== Compilations in English ===
- Le Bal / Snow in Autumn, trans. Sandra Smith (2007)
- David Golder, The Ball, Snow in Autumn, The Courilof Affair, trans. Sandra Smith (2008)

== Awards and honours ==
- 2004: Prix Renaudot, for Suite française

== Adaptations ==
- An opera made from the 1930 novel Le Bal was first performed in 2010 at the Hamburg Opera House, Germany (composed by Oscar Strasnoy, adapted by Matthew Jocelyn.)
- A dramatization of the 1930 novel Le malentendu was broadcast by BBC Radio as The Misunderstanding in January 2019.
- A film dramatization of 'Suite Francais' was released by the Weinstein Company, BBC, and others in 2015: Suite Française (film).

== Biography ==
A biography of Némirovsky, Irene Nemirovsky: Her Life And Works, written by Jonathan Weiss, was published in 2006.

== See also ==
- Hélène Berr – French diarist
- Hana Brady – Jewish girl and Holocaust victim; subject of the children's book Hana's Suitcase
- Helga Deen – wrote a diary in Herzogenbusch concentration camp (Camp Vught)
- Etty Hillesum – wrote a diary in Amsterdam and Camp Westerbork
- Věra Kohnová – Czech diarist
- David Koker – wrote a diary in Herzogenbusch concentration camp (Camp Vught)
- Janet Langhart – author of a one-act play, "Anne and Emmett"
- Rutka Laskier – Polish diarist
- Bruce Marshall – Scottish novelist; his life has parallels with Némirovsky's and his novel Yellow Tapers for Paris is similar to Suite française
- Tanya Savicheva – Russian child diarist
- Sophie Scholl – German student executed by the Nazis
- Henio Zytomirski – Polish boy who was a Holocaust victim
- The Dogs and the Wolves (novel)
