= Suite française (Némirovsky novel) =

Planned sequence of five novels by Irène Némirovsky

- First edition
- Author: Irène Némirovsky
- Translator: Sandra Smith
- Cover artist: Roger Viollet
- Language: French
- Publisher: Denoel
- Publication date: 31 October 2004
- Publication place: France
- Media type: Paperback; Hardback
- Pages: 434 pp (first edition, paperback)
- ISBN: 978-2-207-25645-9 (first edition, paperback)
- OCLC: 56682049
- Dewey Decimal: 843/.912 22
- LC Class: PQ2627.E4 S85 2004

Suite française (French pronunciation: [sɥit fʁɑ̃sɛːz]; 'French Suite') is the title of a planned sequence of five novels by Irène Némirovsky, a French writer of Ukrainian-Jewish origin. In July 1942, having just completed the first two of the series, Némirovsky was arrested as a Jew and detained at Pithiviers and then Auschwitz, where she was murdered, a victim of the Holocaust. The notebook containing the two novels was preserved by her daughters but not examined until 1998. They were published in a single volume entitled Suite française in 2004.

== Background ==
The sequence was to portray life in France in the period following June 1940, the month in which the German army rapidly defeated the French and fought the British; Paris and northern France came under German occupation on 14 June. The first novel, Tempête en juin (Storm in June) depicts the flight of citizens from Paris in the hours preceding the German advance and in the days following it. The second, Dolce (Sweet), shows life in a small French country town, Bussy (in the suburbs just east of Paris), in the first, strangely peaceful, months of the German occupation. These first two novels seem able to exist independently from each other on first reading. The links between them are rather tenuous; as Némirovsky observes in her notebook, it is history, and not the characters, that unite them.

The third novel, Captivité (Captivity), for which Némirovsky left a plot outline, would have shown the coalescing of a resistance, with some characters introduced in Tempête en juin and Dolce having been arrested and put under threat of death, in Paris. The fourth and fifth novels would perhaps have been called Batailles (Battles) and La Paix (Peace) but these exist only as titles in Némirovsky's notebook, against which she had placed question marks. Nothing can be said about the plots of Batailles and La Paix. To quote Némirovsky's notes, they are "in limbo, and what limbo! It's really in the lap of the gods since it depends on what happens".

== Books ==
=== Tempête en juin ===
The narrative follows several groups of characters who encounter one another rarely if at all. All are impelled to flee from Paris in advance of the German entry into the city. As transport and distribution collapse under German bombardment, all have to change their plans and nearly all lose the veneer of civilization.

The Péricands are making for Nîmes, where they have property. They reach the city but in the course of the journey, Charlotte Péricand's senile father-in-law is left behind (forgotten) while her second son, Hubert, runs away to join the army and shares in its collapse. Her elder son, Philippe, is a priest and is shepherding a party of orphans, who eventually kill him (in a death scene perhaps in need of revision, Némirovsky comments in her notebook, because it is melo [melodramatic]). Gabriel Corte, a well-known writer, flees with his mistress and makes for Vichy, where he may or may not find refuge and employment. Charles Langelet, an aesthete, flees alone in his car, filching petrol from trusting acquaintances in order to get as far as the Loire; he returns to Paris and, in the blackout, is killed in a road accident.

Maurice and Jeanne Michaud, minor employees at a bank, are instructed to go to Tours though deprived at the last minute of the transport promised by their employer. Their son, Jean-Marie is with the army and they have no word of his fate. They cannot get to Tours and eventually return to Paris, unemployed and almost destitute but destined to survive. Jean-Marie is in fact wounded; he is being tended by the Sabarie family at their small farm near Bussy, where he is nursed back to health by Madeleine, the Sabaries' foster daughter. At the end of the novel as postal services are restored, Jean-Marie is able to contact his family and return to Paris. The Michauds, alone among major characters, grow in moral stature as chaos spreads.

=== Dolce ===
The small town of Bussy and its neighbouring farms are the scene throughout. The German occupation seems sweetly peaceful but there is no doubt over the balance of power. The Germans get whatever they ask for; official notices promise the death penalty for those who disobey their regulations, and French collaborators, including the Péricands, make their own settlement with their German overlords.

The main plot concerns Lucile Angellier, whose unfaithful husband is a prisoner of war. She lives uneasily, with her mother-in-law. Theirs being the best house in the village, it is where the German commander, Bruno von Falk, an accomplished musician, is billeted. Unwillingly Lucile finds herself falling in love with him. In this and several parallel strands, the novel explores the deep, perhaps unbridgeable, differences and the perhaps superficial sympathies, between military Germans and rural French.

The minor plot concerns the family of Benoît Sabarie, a prisoner of war who escapes from German captivity, returns home to the family farm near Bussy, marries his fiancée Madeleine and believes (with some justification) that she still pines for Jean-Marie Michaud, whom she nursed during his recovery. Jealous by nature, Benoît also believes that Madeleine risks being seduced by the German interpreter, Bonnet, who is billeted in their house. Betrayed by landowners who catch him poaching, Benoît is arrested for possessing a gun. During the arrest he contrives to shoot Bonnet dead. (In her notebook, Némirovsky mentions a possible revision where Bonnet is wounded, not killed.)

The stories come together when, at Madeleine's request, Lucile conceals Benoît in her house. It is widely assumed that Bruno's presence in the house and his liking for Lucile, will protect her against searches. The need to conceal Benoît brings Lucile and her mother-in-law closer; it drives her apart from Bruno, though he never knows why.

The German troops celebrate the first anniversary of their entry into Paris, and Dolce ends in July 1941, when Germany begins its invasion of the Soviet Union. The troops occupying Bussy are posted to the Eastern Front. Lucile and Bruno fear that he will not survive and she has no difficulty in persuading him to give her a travel document and petrol coupon, which (unknown to him) will enable her to drive Benoît to a new refuge. The title of Dolce, like that of the whole sequence, intentionally recalls musical terminology, dolce means "sweet" or "soft" in musicians' Italian. This title is truthful but also ironic, since bitterness exists under the surface, and a far less peaceful sequel was to follow.

=== Captivité ===
The plot of Némirovsky's third novel exists as a plot outline, with some contradictions, in her notebook. Benoît has "friends" (the nascent Communist resistance) in Paris. Lucile drives him to the city, where he is concealed by the Michauds, whom the Angelliers met briefly in Tempête en juin. In Paris, Benoît and Jean-Marie Michaud are denounced and arrested, and in prison, they meet Hubert. Jean-Marie is pardoned by the Germans, when Lucile contacts Bruno von Falk on his behalf. Benoît and his friends organize an escape and release Jean-Marie and Hubert. Jean-Marie and Lucile meet and fall in love but after learning that she is still in love with Bruno, he leaves to fight against the Germans and dies heroically. On the Eastern Front, Bruno is also killed, Lucile losing her French and German beloveds. In a sub-plot, the writer Gabriel Corte, a relatively minor and unsympathetic character in Tempête en juin, emerges as a propagandist and politician, initially collaborating with the Germans, later perhaps disaffected; Benoît dies brutally and full of hope.

== The manuscript and its rediscovery ==
Suite française, so far as it was completed, was written in microscopic handwriting in a notebook, Tempête and Dolce together filled 140 pages, corresponding to 516 published pages. It would possibly be the earliest work of literary fiction about the Second World War, and is remarkable as a historical novel sequence written during the period that it depicts, transformed far beyond the level of a journal of events such as might be expected to emerge from the turmoil and tragedy Némirovsky experienced. It is extraordinary that the manuscript should have survived in such extreme circumstances, having been carried by Irene Némirovsky's daughter Denise as she was helped to flee from one hiding place to another during the war. Denise kept the notebooks containing the nearly indecipherable manuscript of Suite française unread in a suitcase for more than sixty years, convinced that it would be too painful to read. In the late 1990s, having made arrangements to donate these manuscripts to a French archive, Denise decided to decipher the notebooks first and type them out; and so the novel was discovered and published in association with publisher Olivier Rubinstein in France in 2004.

== Publication history ==
=== French publication ===
Suite française was published by Éditions Denoël, Paris, in 2004. The edition includes a preface by Myriam Anissimov, notes by Némirovsky about the revision and planned continuation of the sequence, and correspondence between Némirovsky herself, her husband Michel Epstein, her publisher Albin Michel and others in the period before and after her deportation.

Suite française won the Prix Renaudot for 2004, the first time that the prize has been awarded posthumously.

=== Translations ===
An English translation by Sandra Smith was published by Chatto & Windus, London, 2004, and by Knopf, New York, in 2006. A Korean translation, 프랑스 조곡 (P'ŭrangsŭ chogok) by Yi Sang-hae was published by Munhak Segyesa in 2005 (ISBN 9788970753522). An Indonesian translation by Mimi Benetto and Lenah Susianty was published by Qanita, Jakarta, in 2011. ISBN 978-602-8579-80-3.

== Reception ==
In The New York Times, Paul Gray called the book "stunning" and argued that it ranks with "the greatest, most humane and incisive fiction that conflict has produced. Janice Kulyk Keefer of The Globe and Mail wrote the book was "miraculous for the power, brilliance and beauty of the writing, and for the very wholeness".

The book continued to receive acclaim among many critics lists after and during its time of release. In 2009, The Times ranked it the fifth best book of the 2000s. In 2014, The Telegraph placed it No. 31 on their list of the all-time greatest novels.

== Similarities with other novels ==
Some readers have noticed similarities between Bruce Marshall's 1943 novel Yellow Tapers for Paris and Irène Némirovsky's Suite française which was written at about the same time but not discovered until 1998. There is no suggestion of plagiarism: Némirovsky was dead before Marshall's novel was published and no one saw Némirovsky's work before its 1998 discovery. Both works have protagonists who work in finance, Marshall's protagonist is an accountant while Némirovsky's work has several characters who work for a bank. Both books were written during and/or immediately after the event but show significant reflection; they are not autobiographical works but fiction featuring invented characters. The stories cover the prelude of the Nazi invasion and its aftermath but the events in the stories are quite different. Marshall's ends before the occupation, while Némirovsky's has significant portions devoted to it. "Dolce," the second part of Suite française, is similar to Le Silence de la mer, a novella by the French author Vercors (pseudonym of Jean Bruller). Both stories deal with a German officer, who in civilian life was a composer, who is quartered in the house of a young French woman. Suite française and Le Silence de la Mer were finished in early 1942.

== Film adaptation ==
The film rights to Suite française were purchased by Universal in 2006. Ronald Harwood, who wrote the script for The Pianist, was set to write the screenplay, with Kathleen Kennedy and Frank Marshall producing the film. In 2007, TF1 Droits Audiovisuels acquired the rights to the novel from publisher Éditions Denoël. The novel was then adapted for the screen by Saul Dibb and Matt Charman, with Dibb directing. Production began to move forward in 2012, with Michelle Williams starring as Lucille Angellier alongside Kristin Scott Thomas as her mother-in-law, and Matthias Schoenaerts as Bruno von Falk. Filming began in Belgium and Paris in June 2013 and the film was released in 2015.
