= List of Catholic writers =

The writers listed on this page should be limited to those who identify as Catholic in some way. This does not mean they are necessarily orthodox in their beliefs. It does mean they identify as Catholic in a religious, cultural, or even aesthetic manner. The common denominator is that at least some (and preferably the majority) of their writing is imbued with a Catholic religious, cultural or aesthetic sensibility.

== Asian languages ==
=== Chinese language ===
- Xu Guangqi – one of the Three Pillars of Chinese Catholicism. He was a Chinese scholar-bureaucrat, agronomist, astronomer, mathematician, and writer during the Ming dynasty. Xu was a colleague and collaborator of the Italian Jesuits Matteo Ricci and Sabatino de Ursis and assisted their translation of several classic Western texts into Chinese, including part of Euclid's Elements.
- Su Xuelin – Chinese educator, essayist, novelist and poet; she described Thorny Heart as a description of her 'personal journey on the road to Catholicism'
- John Ching Hsiung Wu – jurist and author; wrote in Chinese, English, French, and German on Christian spirituality, Chinese literature and legal topics
- Li Yingshi – Ming Chinese military officer and a renowned mathematician,[1] astrologer and feng shui expert, who was among the first Chinese literati to become Christian. Converted to Catholicism by Matteo Ricci and Diego de Pantoja, the first two Jesuits to establish themselves in Beijing.

=== Japanese language ===
- Shusaku Endo – Japanese Roman Catholic novelist; recipient of 1955 Akutagawa Prize
- Ayako Sono – Japanese Roman Catholic novelist; part of the Third Generation
- Jacobo Kyushei Tomonaga – He composed one of the first modern Japanese dictionaries.

=== Vietnamese language ===
- Bảo Đại – last emperor of Vietnam

== European languages ==
=== Albanian language ===
- Gjon Buzuku – priest; wrote the first known printed book in Albanian.
- Pal Engjëlli – Archbishop; wrote the first known document in Albanian
- Gjergj Fishta – poet; in 1937 he completed and published his epic masterpiece Lahuta e Malcís, an epic poem written in the Gheg dialect of Albanian. It contains 17,000 lines and is considered the "Albanian Iliad". He is regarded among the most influential cultural and literary figures of the 20th century in Albania.
- Ndre Mjeda – Jesuit poet; poems include "The Nightingale's Lament" and "Imitation of the Holy Virgin"
- Giulio Variboba – poet; priest, of the Arbëresh Albanian people of Southern Italy, regarded by many Albanians as the first genuine poet in all of Albanian literature
- Pjetër Budi – Bishop; known for his work "Doktrina e Kërshtenë" (The Christian Doctrine), an Albanian translation of the catechism of Robert Bellarmine.

=== Bosnian language ===
- Matija Divković – Bosnian Franciscan and writer from Bosnia; considered to be the founder of the modern literature in Bosnia and Herzegovina

=== Croatian language ===
- Ivan Gundulić – poet; work embodies central characteristics of Catholic Counter-Reformation
- Marko Marulić – poet; inspired by the Bible, Antique writers, and Christian hagiographies
- Andrija Kačić Miošić – poet
- Petar Preradović – was a Croatian poet, writer, and military general of Serb origin. He was one of the most important Croatian poets of the 19th century Illyrian movement and the main representative of romanticism in Croatia.
- Mihalj Šilobod Bolšić – Roman Catholic priest, mathematician, writer, and musical theorist primarily known for writing the first Croatian arithmetic textbook Arithmatika Horvatzka (published in Zagreb, 1758).

=== Czech language ===
- Jindřich Šimon Baar – ordained as a Catholic priest in 1892; wrote about church reform
- Otokar Březina - Catholic in name only (read Mé svědectví o Otokaru Březinovi by Deml)
- Jan Čep - writer of novels; a translator from French
- Jakub Deml – between 1902 and 1909 he was a Catholic priest; suspended in 1912; publishing of his books was prohibited after the communist coup
- Bedřich Bridel - a missionary living in the Baroque era
- Ivan Diviš – converted to Catholicism in 1964 (during the Communist period); he left the country after the Prague Spring ended
- Jaroslav Durych – originally a physician; essayist and poet; wrote the novel Bloudění (from the Thirty Years' War), which was translated into several languages, including English
- Tomáš Halík – priest and writer; priest in the underground church during Communism
- Bohuslav Hasištejnský z Lobkovic – elected Bishop of Olomouc, but was refused by the pope; in the times of Renaissance he stood firm with the Catholic Faith
- Václav Havel – playwright and President of the Czech Republic, converted on his deathbed
- Vladimír Holan – left the Communist Party of Czechoslovakia and re-entered the Catholic Church
- Jan Lipšanský – contemporary Czech writer of Catholic essays (some of them broadcast by Vatican Radio) and some mystery stories with a modern monk solving them
- Bohuslav Reynek - Catholic poet
- Jan Zahradníček – Catholic mystic poet of the early and mid-20th century; because of his writings he was imprisoned as an enemy of the Communists after their coup in 1948

=== Danish language ===
- Jens Johannes Jørgensen – late-19th and early-20th-century poet and novelist; also a biographer of Catholic saints

=== Dutch language ===
- Bertus Aafjes (born Lambertus Jacobus Johannes Aafjes) – 20th-century poet; poems such as "Een Voetreis naar Rome" (1946) and "In den Beginne" (1949) show a strong Catholic faith
- Guido Gezelle – priest (from the predominantly Catholic Flanders)
- Vonne van der Meer – converted in the 1990s; married to Willem Jan Otten
- Henri Nouwen
- Willem Jan Otten – converted in the 1990s, a few years after his wife Vonne van der Meer
- Gerard Reve
- Godfried Bomans
- Joost van den Vondel – dramatist and poet of the Dutch Golden Age; converted to Catholicism from a Mennonite background around 1641; his masterpieces are his dramas on religious and biblical themes, e.g., Lucifer, Noah and his short poems

=== English language ===
As the anti-Catholic laws were lifted in the mid-19th century, there was a revival of Catholicism in the British Empire. There has long been a distinct Catholic strain in English literature.

The most notable figures are Cardinal Newman, a convert, one of the leading prose writers of his time and also a substantial poet, and the priest-poet Gerard Manley Hopkins, also a convert, although most of the latter's works were only published many years after his death. In the early 20th century, G. K. Chesterton, a convert, and Hilaire Belloc, a French-born Catholic who became a British subject, promoted Roman Catholic views in direct apologetics as well as in popular, lighter genres, such as Chesterton's "Father Brown" detective stories. From the 1930s on the "Catholic novel" became a force impossible to ignore, with leading novelists of the day, Evelyn Waugh and Graham Greene, converts both, dealing with distinctively Catholic themes in their work. Although James Hanley was not a practising Catholic, a number of his novels emphasise Catholic beliefs and values, including The Furys Chronicle.

In America, Flannery O'Connor wrote powerful short stories with a Catholic sensibility and focus, set in the American South where she was decidedly in the religious minority.

==== A–C ====
- Lord Acton – 19th-century English historian from a Catholic Recusant family; disagreed with ultramontanism and had Old Catholic Church sympathies, but never left the church; known for the aphorism that "power tends to corrupt, and absolute power corrupts absolutely"
- John L. Allen Jr. – American journalist who has written on Opus Dei and Pope Benedict XVI
- Elizabeth Anscombe – English philosopher
- Kenneth Owen Arvidson (1938–2011) – New Zealand poet
- Maurice Baring – English man of letters, convert, friend of Belloc and Chesterton
- James K Baxter (1926–1972) – New Zealand poet, dramatist, literary critic and social commentator; a convert to Catholicism
- Hilaire Belloc – strongly held, orthodox Catholic views; wrote apologetics, famous comic verse, historical, political and economic works and well-known account of a pilgrimage he took on foot, "The Path to Rome"; French-born but became a British subject and politician
- Christopher Beha – American novelist and revert to Catholicism.
- Robert Hugh Benson – English convert and priest who wrote Lord of the World and apologetics
- William Peter Blatty – American screenwriter and novelist; known for the novel The Exorcist and Academy Award-winning screenplay adapting same
- Martin Stanislaus Brennan – American priest and scientist; wrote books about science and religion
- Heywood Broun – American journalist who covered social justice issues, a convert
- George Mackay Brown – Scottish poet and author
- Orestes Brownson – 19th-century American writer and convert
- Vincent Buckley – Australian poet
- William F. Buckley, Jr. – American writer, journalist and conservative commentator; founder of the National Review; author of God and Man at Yale
- Anthony Burgess – English novelist, critic and composer
- Morley Callaghan – Canadian novelist and short-story writer
- Roy Campbell – South African poet; convert
- Geoffrey Chaucer – English poet of the Middle Ages; wrote The Canterbury Tales; he mocks corrupt clergy, but also presents an ideal priest who teaches sound Catholic doctrine in "The Parson's Tale"
- Brainard Cheney – American novelist and playwright; convert
- G. K. Chesterton – English convert, wrote apologetics including Orthodoxy as well as novels, including The Man Who Was Thursday, poetry, biographies and literary studies, and lighter works including the "Father Brown" detective stories
- Mary Higgins Clark – American mystery and thriller writer
- Brian Coffey – Irish poet; wrote 'The Notion of Order According to St. Thomas Aquinas'
- Suzanne Collins – American author; wrote The Hunger Games
- Robert Cormier – American young-adult writer
- Felicitas Corrigan – English nun and writer
- Richard Crashaw – 17th-century English metaphysical poet; convert; religious poetry includes the "Hymn to St. Teresa"

==== D–G ====
- Henry Darger – American artist and writer
- Bruce Dawe – Australian poet
- Dorothy Day – American convert; co-founder of the Catholic Worker Movement
- Christopher Dawson – British historian and convert; proposed that the medieval Catholic Church was an essential factor in the rise of European civilisation
- Princess Der Ling – American writer of several memoirs, books, and magazine articles
- Christopher Derrick – English non-fiction writer on contemporary issues
- Michael Derrick – English journalist and pamphleteer
- Annie Dillard – American writer of fiction and narrative non-fiction. While her website notes that she espouses no religion, her books deal deeply with theology and Catholic liturgy (especially Holy the Firm and Teaching a Stone to Talk)
- E. J. Dionne – American journalist and political commentator; noted for coverage of Vatican City
- Louisa Emily Dobrée (fl. ca. 1877–1917) – French-Irish writer
- Eleanor C. Donnelly – American poet, short story writer and biographer
- Anna Hanson Dorsey – American novelist and writer for young people
- Ella Loraine Dorsey – American author, journalist, and translator
- Maureen Dowd – American columnist and author, graduate of The Catholic University of America and practicing, but holds positions at variance with the church.
- Ernest Dowson – English decadent poet; converted to Catholicism
- John Dryden – poet of Restoration England; converted to Catholicism in his fifties; his long poem The Hind and the Panther (1687) explains the reasons for his conversion to the Church from Anglicanism
- Eileen Duggan – New Zealand journalist and poet
- Paul Elie - American novelist and contributor to The New Yorker on Catholic topics, and affiliate of Georgetown University
- Alice Thomas Ellis – English novelist and convert from Positivism; became a conservative Roman Catholic critic of the Second Vatican Council and a regular columnist at The Catholic Herald newspaper
- Anthony Esolen – American translator, poet, and commentator
- Abigail Favale – American fiction writer, professor at the University of Notre Dame, author of The Genesis of Gender: A Christian Theory
- John Martin Finlay – American poet and writer, converted to Catholicism a year before his death in 1991
- Mitch Finley – contemporary American writer of more than 30 nonfiction books on Catholic topics
- F. Scott Fitzgerald – American author, raised Catholic, married in a Catholic church, and categorised as Catholic, though he was not a practicing one for most of his life
- Joseph Fitzmyer – American priest and writer
- Robert J. Fox – American author of religious works; director and founder of the Fatima Family Apostolate
- Sinéad Flanagan – Irish writer and poet (husband was Éamon de Valera)
- Michael F. Flynn – American science fiction novelist, author of Eifelheim
- Lady Antonia Fraser – English author, Roman Catholic (converted with her parents as a child); caused a public scandal in 1977 by leaving her Catholic husband for Harold Pinter
- Brian Friel – Irish dramatist, some pre-Christian Celtic elements are in his writing too though
- Maggie Gallagher – American socially conservative writer and commentator; has campaigned against abortion and gay marriage
- Mary Onahan Gallery – American writer, editor and critic
- Florence Magruder Gilmore (1881–1945) – American religious writer, novelist, and translator
- Dana Gioia – American poet and critic; wrote Can Poetry Matter?; recipient of the Laetare Medal award
- Robert Girardi – American author. His novels, especially A Vaudeville of Devils: Seven Moral Tales, examine ethical and religious themes
- Rumer Godden – English writer. After her conversion, she wrote about the mystical aspects of the faith
- Caroline Gordon – American author and short-story writer, convert
- Clotilde Graves – Irish novelist and short-story writer, convert
- Andrew Greeley – Irish-American Roman Catholic priest and novelist
- Graham Greene – English novelist; a convert who wrote The Power and the Glory and focused on themes of human sin and divine mercy; other of his books in which Catholicism plays a central role are Brighton Rock, The Heart of the Matter and The End of the Affair

==== H–K ====
- Radclyffe Hall – English novelist, author of The Well of Loneliness.
- Ron Hansen – American writer, author of Mariette in Ecstasy and The Assassination of Jesse James by the Coward Robert Ford
- Jon Hassler – American novelist –
- Seamus Heaney – Irish poet; translated Beowulf; pre-Christian aspects are important in his work –
- Peter Hebblethwaite – English journalist and biographer
- Ernest Hemingway – American novelist and war correspondent; works include Farewell to Arms and The Sun Also Rises
- Tony Hendra – English author and satirist, author of Father Joe: The Man Who Saved My Soul
- Solange Hertz – American spiritual writer
- Patrick Holland – Australian novelist and short-story writer
- Tony Hillerman – American author of murder mysteries in the Navajo Nation
- Rosamund Hodge – American novelist and short-story writer; works include "Cruel Beauty" and "Crimson Bound"
- Gerard Manley Hopkins – English Jesuit priest and poet; known for "The Wreck of the Deutschland" and "God's Grandeur"
- Paul Horgan – American writer of historical books and novels
- Stephen Hough – British musician and writer, author of The Bible as Prayer – a handbook for Lectio Divina and The Final Retreat
- Deal W. Hudson – American writer, philosopher, radio show host, and political commentator.
- Pauline von Hügel – Italian-British writer, founder of Corpus Christi Church, Boscombe
- Robert Hutchinson – American religion writer, columnist and essayist, author of When in Rome: A Journal of Life in Vatican City,
- Elizabeth Inchbald – English actress, novelist, and playwright
- Laura Ingraham – American conservative commentator, author and radio show host; often appears on Fox News and EWTN
- Lionel Johnson – English poet
- Paul Johnson – English historian and journalist – wrote A History of Christianity,
- David Jones – British modernist poet
- James Joyce – Irish novelist, author of Ulysses and Finnegans Wake
- Julian of Norwich – English mystic and anchoress; her mystical experiences are recorded in A Revelation of Divine Love or simply Showings
- George Kelly – Pulitzer Prize-winning actor and playwright
- Margery Kempe – English mystic and author; wrote one of the first autobiographies in the English language
- Jack Kerouac – American author of On the Road
- Lady Amabel Kerr – British writer of biographies of religious figures
- Joyce Kilmer – American author and poet. Poetry titles include The Robe of Christ and The Rosary
- Russell Kirk – American conservative political theorist and author
- Ronald Knox – English priest and classicist who translated the Bible from the Latin Vulgate in the 20th century
- Dean Koontz – American novelist; known for moralistic thrillers
- Peter Kreeft – American professor and author of books on Christian philosophy, theology and apologetics
- Erik von Kuehnelt-Leddihn – Austrian political writer and novelist, whose most influential works were first published in English

==== L–M ====
- Jane Lane – English author of historical novels and biographies
- George Parsons Lathrop – American writer who co-founded the Catholic Summer School of America
- Margaret Wynne Lawless – American poet, author, educator and philanthropist
- Patrick Anthony Lawlor – New Zealand writer
- Penny Lernoux – American writer for the National Catholic Reporter, former nun and critic of the Catholic hierarchy and US foreign policy
- Elmore Leonard – American writer of Western novels and screenwriter of films such as Get Shorty
- Eddie Linden – Scottish-Irish poet and editor of Aquarius magazine
- David Lodge – British novelist; often writes about the post-Vatican II church
- Barry Lopez – American short-story writer and essayist
- John Lukacs – Hungarian-American historian
- Sara Maitland – Feminist British writer; has made use of Catholic spiritual themes
- Rosie Malek-Yonan – American human rights activist and author of The Crimson Field.
- Paul Mariani – American poet, critic, memoirist; biographer of William Carlos Williams, Hart Crane, and other literary figures.
- Malachi Martin – Irish-American novelist
- Bruce Marshall – Scottish writer
- Francis A. Marzen – Hawaiian journalist
- Sophie Dora Spicer Maude – English writer
- Bernadette Devlin McAliskey – Northern Irish nationalist politician and writer
- James McAuley – Australian poet. Some poems are imbued with a Catholic vision, e.g. "Captain Quiros"
- Frank McCourt and Malachy McCourt – American Catholic brothers; Irish Catholic identities and cultures; writers/novelists
- Henry McDonald – British writer and columnist from Northern Ireland for The Guardian
- Ralph McInerny – Irish-American philosophy professor at Notre Dame University; wrote the Father Dowling series of mystery novels
- Marshall McLuhan – Canadian philosopher and communications theorist
- Thomas Merton – American monk and writer
- Alice Meynell – British poet and suffragist, much of her poetry is religiously themed.
- Sandra Miesel – American writer who co-wrote The Da Vinci Hoax
- Thomas More – English statesman, lawyer, and martyr of Henry VIII's reign. Most of his works were written in Latin, but later devotional writings, such as Dialogue of Comfort against Tribulation, were in English.
- Thomas Moore – American monk and author of popular spiritual books – 19th-century Irish poet
- J. B. Morton – *Malcolm Muggeridge – English journalist, broadcaster and writer
- Clara Mulholland – Irish novelist, playwright, children's writer, translator
- Timothy L. Murphy – American president of Santa Clara University, author of Discovery of America by the Irish Previous to the Ninth Century
- Les Murray – Australian poet –

==== N–R ====
- John Henry Newman – convert; became a Catholic priest and later a Cardinal; master of English prose, e.g., his Apologia Pro Vita Sua; also wrote poetry, e.g., Lead, Kindly Light and The Dream of Gerontius
- Aidan Nichols – Catholic theologian
- Henri Nouwen – Dutch Catholic priest; left academic post to work with the mentally challenged at the L'Arche community of Daybreak in Toronto, Canada
- Michael Novak – contemporary politically conservative American political writer
- Alfred Noyes – English poet; known for "The Highwayman"; wrote about his conversion to Catholicism in The Unknown God (1934)
- Kate O'Beirne – wrote syndicated columns for the National Review and other conservative publications; also wrote books
- Flannery O'Connor – her writing was deeply informed by the sacramental, and the Thomist notion that the created world is charged with God; like Graham Greene and Francois Mauriac she often focused on sin and human evil
- Flann O'Brien – Irish comic writer
- Michael D. O'Brien – Canadian Catholic novelist; works include the "Father Elijah" series
- Katharine A. O'Keeffe O'Mahoney – Irish-born American educator, lecturer, writer
- Lee Oser – American novelist and literary critic; Christian humanist
- Coventry Patmore – 19th-century poet; a convert
- Craig Paterson – philosopher and writer on bioethics
- Joseph Pearce – English literary scholar and critic; former British National Front member who renounced racism on conversion; edited the anthology Flowers of Heaven: 1000 Years of Christian Verse; biographer of Oscar Wilde and Hilaire Belloc
- Walker Percy – Southern American convert and novelist who helped create the Fellowship of Southern Writers. He was also the man who discovered and helped publish the work of the deceased John Kennedy Toole. His most well-known novel, The Moviegoer, won the U.S. National Book Award for Fiction in 1962.
- David Pietrusza – American historian, editor of "Sursum Corda: Documents and Readings on the Traditional Latin Mass"
- Ramesh Ponnuru – American conservative political writer; wrote The Party of Death attacking the pro-choice lobby in the United States
- Alexander Pope – English poet; a Roman Catholic in a period when that was potentially unsafe in England (the early 18th century)
- Katherine Anne Porter – on-again, off-again convert
- J. F. Powers – American writer of stories about clerical life
- Tim Powers – American fantasy novelist, author of On Stranger Tides
- Timothy Radcliffe – Dominican Order lecturer, writer, and professor
- Piers Paul Read – contemporary but orthodox Catholic British novelist; vice president of the Catholic Writers Guild
- Anne Rice – American writer; after a long separation from her Catholic faith during which she described herself as atheist, she returned to the church in 1998 and pledged to use her talents to glorify God; in 2010, she recanted her faith, declaring that she was going to follow Christ without Christianity, out of solidarity for her gay son
- David Adams Richards – award-winning Canadian novelist, essayist and screenwriter; from New Brunswick
- Francis Ripley – English priest; wrote about the faith
- Carol Jackson Robinson – American convert, journalist, author, and public speaker
- Richard Rohr – contemporary American Franciscan friar
- Frederick Rolfe (alias Baron Corvo) – late-19th- and early-20th-century novelist; a failed aspirant to the priesthood
- Raymond Roseliep – American priest and poet
- Kevin Rush – American lay Catholic, playwright of award-winning stage play, Crossing Event Horizon, about a Catholic high school guidance counselor's midlife crisis, and novelist, author of Earthquake Weather, a novel for Catholic teens, and The Lance and the Veil, an adventure in the time of Christ.

==== S–Z ====
- Anna T. Sadlier – Canadian writer, translator
- Mary Anne Sadlier – Irish author
- George Santayana – Spanish-American philosopher and novelist; baptised Catholic; despite taking a sceptical stance in his philosophy to belief in the existence of God, he identified himself with Catholic culture, referring to himself as an "aesthetic Catholic"
- Steven Schloeder – American architect and theologian; wrote book Architecture in Communion (San Francisco: Ignatius Press, 1998)
- William Shakespeare – regarded by most to be the greatest playwright and poet in the English language, as well as being one of the greatest writers in the world; although disputed, a growing number of biographers and critics hold that his religion was Catholic
- John Patrick Shanley – screenwriter and playwright; educated by the Irish Christian Brothers and the Sisters of Charity
- Patrick Augustine Sheehan – Canon Sheehan of Doneraile, Catholic priest, novelist essayist and poet; significant figure of the renouveau Catholique in English literature in the United States and in Europe
- Dame Edith Sitwell – English poet; a convert
- Robert Smith – American Catholic priest, author and educator
- Joseph Sobran – wrote for The Wanderer, an orthodox Roman Catholic journal
- St. Robert Southwell – 16th-century Jesuit; martyred during the persecutions of Elizabeth I; wrote religious poetry, i.e., "The Burning Babe", and Catholic tracts
- Dame Muriel Spark – Scottish novelist; decided to join the Roman Catholic Church in 1954 and considered it crucial in her becoming a novelist in the tradition of Evelyn Waugh and Graham Greene; novels often focus on human evil and sin
- Robert Spencer – writer and commentator on Islam and jihad
- Karl Stern – German-Jewish convert and psychiatrist
- Francis Stuart – Australian-born Irish-nationalist Catholic convert; son-in-law of Maud Gonne; accused of anti-Semitism in his later years by Maire McEntee O'Brien and Kevin Myers
- Jon M. Sweeney – American author of many books on religion, popular history, and memoir; convert
- Susie Forrest Swift (later, Sister M. Imelda Teresa, 1862–1916), American Dominican nun, magazine editor, writer
- Harry Sylvester – American journalist, short story writer, and novelist; most famous books were the Catholic novels Dayspring and Moon Gaffney
- Ellen Tarry – writer of young-adult literature and The Third Door: The Autobiography of an American Negro Woman
- Allen Tate – convert; poet and essayist
- Mrs. Bartle Teeling – convert; articles, biographical sketches, books
- Francis Thompson – 19th-century poet; wrote the devotional poem "The Hound of Heaven"
- Colm Toibin – Irish actor and writer; wrote The Sign of the Cross
- J. R. R. Tolkien – writer of The Lord of the Rings; devout and practicing Catholic
- John Kennedy Toole – Pulitzer Prize-winning writer of A Confederacy of Dunces.
- F. X. Toole (born Jerry Boyd) – Irish-American Catholic
- Meriol Trevor – convert; author of historical novels, biographies, and children's stories
- Lizzie Velásquez – writer of self-help, autobiographical, and young adult non-fiction
- Elena Maria Vidal – historical novelist
- Louie Verrecchio – Italian-American columnist for Catholic News Agency and author of Catholic faith formation materials and related books.
- Christopher Villiers – British Catholic theologian and poet; author of Sonnets From the Spirit.
- Maurice Walsh – one of the most popular Irish writers of the 1930s and 1940s, now chiefly remembered for the Hollywood film of his short story 'The Quiet Man;' wrote for the Irish Catholic magazine the Capuchin Annual and listed in the 1948 publication 'Catholic Authors: Contemporary Biographical Sketches, 1930–1952, Volume 1;'
- Auberon Waugh – comic novelist and columnist; son of Evelyn Waugh
- Evelyn Waugh – novelist; converted to Roman Catholicism in 1930; his religious ideas are manifest, either explicitly or implicitly, in all of his later work; strongly orthodox and conservative Roman Catholic
- Morris West – Australian writer; several of his novels are set in the Vatican
- Donald E. Westlake – American writer; three-time Edgar Award winner
- Antonia White – author of four novels – including her 1933 novel Frost in May, based on her experiences at her Catholic boarding school – two children's books, and a short story collection.
- Henry William Wilberforce – English journalist and essayist
- Tennessee Williams – convert, American playwright and poet, who wrote such noted plays as The Glass Menagerie, The Cat on a Hot Tin Roof, and A Streetcar Named Desire.
- D.B. Wyndham-Lewis – English comic writer and biographer
- Oscar Wilde – late-19th-century playwright and poet; fascinated by Catholicism as a young man and much of his early poetry shows this heavy influence; embraced a homosexual lifestyle later on, but converted to Catholicism on his deathbed (receiving a conditional baptism as there is some evidence, including his own vague recollection, that his mother had him baptised in the Catholic Church as a child)
- Gene Wolfe – science-fiction author; has written many novels and multivolume series; some, such as the Book of the New Sun and the Book of the Long Sun, are considered to be religious allegory
- Julia Amanda Sargent Wood (pen name, Minnie Mary Lee; 1825 – 1903), American author
- Carol Zaleski – American philosopher of religion, essayist and author of books on Catholic theology and on comparative religion

=== French language ===
There was a strong Catholic strain in 20th-century French literature, encompassing Paul Claudel, Georges Bernanos, François Mauriac, and Julien Green.

==== A–K ====
- Honoré de Balzac – 19th-century novelist; wrote in a preface to La Comédie Humaine that "Christianity, and especially Catholicism, being a complete repression of man's depraved tendencies, is the greatest element in Social Order"
- Jules Barbey d'Aurevilly – 19th-century novelist and short story writer, who specialised in mysterious tales that examine hidden motivation and hinted evil bordering the supernatural
- Charles Baudelaire – 19th-century decadent poet; long debate as to what extent Baudelaire was a believing Catholic; work is dominated by an obsession with the Devil and original sin, and often utilises Catholic imagery and theology
- Georges Bernanos – novelist, a devout Catholic; novels include The Diary of a Country Priest
- Leon Bloy – late-19th- and early-20th-century novelist
- Louis Gabriel Ambroise de Bonald – counter-revolutionary philosophical writer
- Jacques-Benigne Bossuet – 17th-century bishop, preacher and master of French prose; wrote famous funeral orations and doctrinal works
- Pierre Boulle – writer; novels include The Bridge over the River Kwai (1952) and Planet of the Apes (1963)
- Paul Bourget – novelist
- Pierre Boutang
- Louis Bouyer - French Oratorian priest and theologian, former Lutheran minister, convert to Catholicism, a founder of the journal Communio with Joseph Ratzinger and Hans Urs von Balthasar
- Pauline Cassin Caro (1828/34/35–1901), novelist
- Jean Pierre de Caussade – Jesuit and spiritual writer
- The Vicomte de Chateaubriand – founder of Romanticism in French literature; returned to the Catholic faith of his 1790s boyhood; wrote apologetic for Christianity, "Génie du christianisme" ("The Genius of Christianity"), which contributed to a post-Revolutionary revival of Catholicism in France
- Paul Claudel – devout Catholic poet; a leading figure in French poetry of the early 20th century; author of verse dramas focusing on religious themes
- François Coppée
- Pierre Corneille – founder of French tragedy; Jesuit-educated; translated The Imitation of Christ, Thomas à Kempis, into French verse
- Léon Daudet
- René Descartes – one of the most famous philosophers in the world; dubbed the father of modern philosophy; much subsequent Western philosophy is a response to his writings, which are studied closely to this day; also a mathematician and a scientist.
- Pierre Duhem – late-19th-century physicist, historian and philosopher of physics
- Saint Francis de Sales – Bishop of Geneva from 1602 to 1622; a Doctor of the Church; wrote classic devotional works, e.g., Introduction à la vie dévote (Introduction to the Devout Life) and Traité de l' Amour de Dieu (Treatise on the Love of God); Pope Pius XI proclaimed him patron saint of writers and journalists
- François Fénelon – late-17th- and early-18th-century writer and archbishop; some of his writings were condemned as Quietist by Pope Innocent XII; he obediently submitted to the judgment of the Holy See
- Pauline Fréchette (1889–1943), poet, dramatist, journalist, nun
- Reginald Garrigou-Lagrange – neo-Thomist theologian
- Henri Ghéon – French poet and critic; his experiences as an army doctor during the First World War saw him regain his Catholic faith (as described in his work "L'homme né de la guerre", "The Man Born Out of the War"); from then on much of his work portrays episodes from the lives of the saints
- Étienne Gilson – philosophical and historical writer and leading neo-Thomist
- René Girard – historian, literary critic and philosopher
- Julien Green – novelist and diarist; convert from Protestantism; A devout Catholic, most of his books focused on the ideas of faith and religion as well as hypocrisy.
- Pierre Helyot – Franciscan history writer
- Hergé – nom de plume of the writer and illustrator of Tintin, one of the most popular European comics of the 20th century, answer to Le Petit Vingtième request for a Catholic reporter that fought evil around the world
- Victor Hugo – French novelist and poet
- Joris-Karl Huysmans – originally a decadent novelist, his later novels, En Route (1895), La Cathédrale (1898) and L'Oblat (1903), trace his conversion to Roman Catholicism
- Max Jacob
- Francis Jammes – late-19th- and early-20th-century poet
- Pierre de Jarric – French missionary and author
- Marcel Jouhandeau

==== L–Z ====
- Brother Lawrence – 17th-century Carmelite lay brother; known for the spiritual classic "The Practice of the Presence of God"
- Frédéric Le Play
- Henri de Lubac – priest (later cardinal) and leading theologian
- Joseph de Maistre – late-18th- and early-19th-century writer and philosopher from Savoy, one of the most influential intellectual opponents of the French Revolution and a firm defender of the authority of the Papacy
- Joseph Malègue – novelist
- Gabriel Marcel – convert; philosopher and playwright
- Jacques Maritain – convert; Catholic philosophical writer
- Henri Massis
- François Mauriac – devout Catholic novelist; a strong influence on Graham Greene, whose themes are sin and redemption; recipient of the 1952 Nobel Prize in Literature
- Saint Louis de Montfort – priest; wrote The True Devotion to Mary; Catholic saint
- Malika Oufkir – Moroccan writer imprisoned with her mother and siblings in a secret Saharan prison for 15 years; these years are recounted in her autobiography, La Prisonniere, later translated into English as Stolen Lives: Twenty Years in a Desert Jail
- Blaise Pascal – polymath (physicist, mathematician and philosopher); made significant contributions to various fields including probability and mathematics; wrote Pensées
- Charles Péguy – poet; long poems include "Mysteres de Charité de Jeanne d'Arc" ("Mysteries of the Charity of Joan of Arc") and "Le mystère des saints innocents" ("The Mystery of the Holy Innocents")
- Charles Perrault – wrote epic Christian poetry before establishing the fairy tale literary genre with Tales of Mother Goose
- Jean Raspail – 20th-century French novelist; known for Camp of the Saints
- Pierre Reverdy – 20th-century French poet
- Arthur Rimbaud – 19th-century poet and confessional writing pioneer; author of A Season in Hell; self-professed "voyant", or seer
- Saint Therese of Lisieux – 19th-century Carmelite nun and now a Doctor of the Church; autobiography, L'histoire d'un âme (The Story of a Soul), was a best-seller and remains a spiritual classic
- Gustave Thibon
- Jules Verne – science-fiction writer
- Louis Veuillot – 19th-century French Catholic journalist

=== German language ===
==== A–M ====
- Franz Xaver von Baader
- Hans Urs von Balthasar – theologian; wrote literary criticism and biographies of the saints
- Heinrich Böll – novelist
- Clemens Brentano – German poet and novelist of Italian origins; leading figure in the Romantic movement; later withdrew to a monastery and acted as secretary to the visionary nun Blessed Anne Catherine Emmerich
- Hermann Broch – convert; author of modernist novels, The Death of Virgil and The Sleepwalkers
- Paul-Henri Campbell – German-American poet, essayist, theologian, and religious tattoo expert
- Heinrich Seuse Denifle – Austrian Dominican friar; historian and paleographer
- Alfred Döblin – novelist; wrote the novel Berlin Alexanderplatz before he converted to Catholicism in 1941
- Heimito von Doderer
- Annette von Droste-Hülshoff – 19th-century poet; strict Catholic; many of her poems are religious
- Joseph Freiherr von Eichendorff – 19th-century poet and novelist
- Hanna-Barbara Gerl-Falkovitz – 20th- to 21st-century philosopher, scholar
- Ida Friederike Görres – 20th-century writer
- Joseph Görres – late-18th- and early-19th-century journalist and writer
- Günter Grass
- Romano Guardini – Italian-born German theologian
- Theodor Haecker – translator and writer; convert; opponent of the Nazis
- Karl Ludwig von Haller
- Dietrich von Hildebrand – philosopher and theologian (wrote in both German and English); convert
- Hugo von Hofmannsthal – late-19th- and early-20th-century Austrian poet and playwright; later plays revealed a growing interest in religious, and particularly Roman Catholic, themes
- Elisabeth Langgässer (1899–1950) – Catholic writer; the Nazis deemed her "too Jewish"; admired by Pope Benedict XVI
- Gertrud von Le Fort – convert
- Alexander Lernet-Holenia
- Martin Mosebach – novelist, poet, playwright, and noted critic of the liturgical reforms which followed Vatican II
- Adam Müller

==== N–Z ====
- Ludwig von Pastor – historian; wrote multi-volume history of the popes
- Josef Pieper – German Thomist philosopher
- Erich Maria Remarque
- Joseph Roth – convert
- Max Scheler
- Friedrich von Schlegel – convert
- Aloysius Schlör (1805–1852) – Austrian ascetic writer
- Carl Schmitt
- Angelus Silesius – 17th-century convert to Catholicism from Lutheranism; became a priest and wrote religious poems, some of which became famous as hymns in the German-speaking world; some of his poetry seems to lean towards pantheism or quietism, but his prose works were orthodox, and the Catholic Encyclopedia says he repudiated any unorthodox interpretation of those poems
- Robert Spaemann – philosopher
- Othmar Spann
- Friedrich von Spee – 17th-century Jesuit priest and author of religious poetry
- Adrienne von Speyr
- Adalbert Stifter
- Count Friedrich Leopold zu Stolberg-Stolberg – late-18th- and early 19th-century poet; convert
- Blessed Henry Suso – 14th-century Dominican friar; devotional writer of the Middle Ages, including "the Minnesinger of Divine Love" in works such as his Little Book of Eternal Wisdom; his works contributed to the formation of German prose
- Karl Freiherr von Vogelsang
- Ernst Wiechert
- Josef Weinheber

=== Icelandic language ===
- Halldór Laxness – journalist, novelist, playwright, poet and short-story writer; recipient of the 1955 Nobel Prize in Literature, pre-1927 works only
- Jón Sveinsson – Jesuit children's writer; lived in France after age 13, but wrote children's books in Icelandic

=== Irish language ===
- Eibhlín Dubh Ní Chonaill (also known as Eileen O' Connell) – Irish noblewoman and poet; known for a lament on the death of her Catholic husband
- Aogán Ó Rathaille (also known as Egan O'Rahilly) – Irish Jacobite poet; wrote of a decline for Catholics in Ireland
- Patrick Pearse (also known as Pádraic or Pádraig Pearse) – Irish teacher, barrister, poet, writer, nationalist and political activist; one of the leaders of the Easter Rising in 1916; educated by the Christian Brothers; established St. Enda's School; also wrote in English
- Máirtín Ó Direáin, Irish-language poet.
- Amhlaoibh Ó Súilleabháin (1780–1838) – Irish language author and one-time hedge school master; is also known as Humphrey O'Sullivan. Was deeply involved in Daniel O'Connell's Catholic Emancipation movement and in relief work among the poor of County Kilkenny. His diary, published later as Cín Lae Amhlaoibh, was kept between 1827 and 1835. "His personal charisma allowed him to cross social and religious barriers, and he used this affability to collect signatures in support of Catholic Emancipation – even getting non-Catholic friends to add their names to 'The Protestant Declaration in favour of Catholic Emancipation'."

=== Italian language ===
- Giuseppe Agnelli – born in Naples; known for his catechetical and devotional works
- Albert of Castile (c. 1460–1522) – Catholic priest and historian
- Ludovico Ariosto – poet; known for his romance epic poem Orlando Furioso (1516)
- Riccardo Bacchelli
- Baldassare Castiglione – in 1521, Pope Leo X conceded him the tonsura (first sacerdotal ceremony)
- Saint Catherine of Siena – Doctor of the Church; wrote Dialogue of Divine Providence
- Eugenio Corti
- Dante Alighieri (simply called Dante) – his Divine Comedy is often considered the greatest Christian poem; Pope Benedict XV praised him in an encyclical, writing that of all Catholic literary geniuses "highest stands the name of Dante"
- Grazia Deledda – Italian novelist; recipient of 1926 Nobel Prize in Literature
- Antonio Fogazzaro
- Giovannino Guareschi – wrote the "Don Camillo" series of stories about a village priest and his rivalry with the Communist mayor
- Alessandro Manzoni – wrote the novel I promessi sposi (The Betrothed) which reflects his Catholic faith; in his youth "he imbibed the anti-Catholic creed of Voltairianism", but after his marriage, under the influence of his wife, he "exchanged it for a fervent Catholicism"
- Giovanni Papini
- Francesco Petrarca
- Pope Pius II – in his younger days he had been a poet laureate and had written an erotic novel, Eurialus and Lucretia; later he wrote histories and epistles
- Clemente Rebora – poet and Rosminian priest
- Torquato Tasso – 16th-century poet; died one day before being crowned by pope Clement VIII as poet laureate
- Giuseppe Ungaretti

=== Latin language ===
- Saint Ambrose – Bishop of Milan; one of the Four Latin Church Fathers; notable for his influence on Augustine; promoter of antiphonal chant and for the Ambrosian Rite
- Augustine of Hippo – earliest theologian and philosopher of the Church still having wide influence today; Bishop of Hippo; one of the Four Church Fathers; known for his apologetic work Confessions
- Boethius – philosopher; known for The Consolation of Philosophy
- Pope Gregory I – Pope; one of the Four Latin Church Fathers; born to a patrician family in Rome and became a monk; known today as being the first monk to become Pope and for traditionally being credited with Gregorian chant; emphasized charity in Rome
- Saint Jerome – one of the Four Latin Church Fathers; known for translating the Bible into Latin; this translation is known as the Vulgate and became the founding source for Biblical subjects in the West
- Saint Thomas Aquinas – one of the greatest philosophers, known for his Summa Theologica

=== Lithuanian language ===
- Maironis – Romantic poet and priest
- Vaižgantas – priest and an activist during the Lithuanian National Revival
- Antanas Strazdas – priest, writer, and poet; became a folklore hero because of his humble origins
- Motiejus Valančius – Catholic bishop of Samogitia, historian and one of the best known Lithuanian writers of the 19th century

=== Norwegian language ===
- Jon Fosse – novelist, 2023 Nobel Prize in Literature recipient, and convert to Catholicism.
- Sigrid Undset – convert whose Medieval trilogy Kristin Lavransdatter has received high praise in Catholic circles; recipient of 1926 Nobel Prize in Literature

=== Polish language ===
- Jan Kochanowski – provost, regarded as the greatest Polish poet
- Pope John Paul II – wrote plays in his youth, later wrote poetry as well as, of course, philosophical works and devotional meditations
- Zofia Kossak-Szczucka – writer of historical novels; helped save Jews in occupied Poland during World War II
- Ignacy Krasicki – Polish bishop
- Zygmunt Krasiński – poet, one of the three greatest in Poland
- Czesław Miłosz – Polish poet, prose writer, translator and diplomat Lithuania born
- Grażyna Miller – Polish poet and translator; translated the poem Roman Triptych (2003) by Pope John Paul II from Polish into Italian
- Adam Naruszewicz – Jesuit poet
- Władysław Reymont – novelist; recipient of 1924 Nobel Prize in Literature for his four-part novel Chłopi (The Peasants)
- Henryk Sienkiewicz – novelist; recipient of 1905 Nobel Prize in Literature; his novel Quo Vadis (1895) deals with the rise and persecution of Christianity in Rome
- Jan Twardowski – poet; became a priest in 1948 and a provost in 1959

=== Portuguese language ===
- Mariana Alcoforado – Poor Clares member; considered by some to have written the Letters of a Portuguese Nun
- Francisco do Monte Alverne – Brazilian franciscan friar, theologian and preacher
- Gustavo Barroso – Brazilian integralist writer, lawyer and politician
- Manuel Bernardes (see Manuel Bernades) – Portuguese priest and writer
- Pero Vaz de Caminha – Portuguese knight, writer and secretary, known for the official report of the discovery of Brazil
- Luís de Camões – Catholic; his poem is (among other things) a call to arms against the enemies of the Christian faith
- Lúcio Cardoso – Catholic writer, poet and playwright
- Miguel Esteves Cardoso – contemporary writer, critic and journalist
- Otto Maria Carpeaux – Austrian-born Brazilian journalist and literary historian and critic
- Olavo de Carvalho – Brazilian philosopher, journalist and essayist
- Gustavo Corção (see pt:Gustavo Corção) – Brazilian Catholic writer
- Denis of Portugal – signed a favouring agreement with the pope and swore to protect the church's interests
- Santa Rita Durão – Luso-Brazilian Augustinian friar and Neoclassic poet
- Otávio de Faria – Brazilian novelist and journalist
- Orlando Fedeli – Brazilian Traditionalist Catholic historian, teacher and political activist
- Jackson de Figueiredo – Brazilian lawyer, journalist and essayist
- Alceu Amoroso Lima – Brazilian Catholic writer and activist
- Gregório de Matos – Colonial Brazil Catholic poet, satirist and lawyer
- Fábio de Melo – Contemporary Brazilian Catholic priest, writer and artist
- Plinio Corrêa de Oliveira – Brazilian Catholic professor, writer and founder of the Tradition, Family, Property movement
- Murilo Mendes – Brazilian convert, Modernist poet and surrealist forerunner
- Adélia Prado – Brazilian Catholic poet
- Paulo Ricardo – Contemporary Brazilian Catholic priest, writer and professor
- Nelson Rodrigues – Brazilian playwright and journalist
- Marcelo Rossi – Brazilian Catholic priest, artist and writer
- Plínio Salgado – Brazilian writer, journalist, politician and founder of Brazilian Integralism
- Mário Ferreira dos Santos – Brazilian philosopher, translator and Christian anarchist thinker
- Arlindo Veiga dos Santos – Brazilian Monarchist intellectual and poet, founder of Patrianovism
- Luís de Sousa – Portuguese monk and prose-writer
- Ariano Suassuna – Brazilian catholic playwright and writer, author of "Auto da Compadecida"
- Gil Vicente – Portuguese writer of the Renaissance
- António Vieira – Portuguese Jesuit priest, writer, preacher and orator, known for his sermons about Colonial Brazil's society

=== Russian language ===
- Regina Derieva – Russian poet; a convert to Catholicism
- Ivan Gagarin – Jesuit and writer
- Demetrius Augustine Gallitzin – Russian emigrant and Catholic priest; born in the Hague in the Netherlands; currently a Servant of God
- Vyacheslav Ivanov – Russian poet, playwright, philosopher and translator; was associated with the Russian Symbolist movement; a convert to Catholicism
- Pyotr Kozlovsky – Russian man of letters and diplomat; a convert to Catholicism
- Vladimir Pecherin – Russian poet and Catholic priest; a convert to Catholicism

=== Slovenian language ===
- France Balantič – poet
- France Bevk – novelist
- Fran Saleški Finžgar – writer and priest
- Alojz Gradnik – poet
- Edvard Kocbek – poet, writer, essayist and Christian socialist
- Boris Pahor – writer and Christian humanist
- Ivan Pregelj – novelist
- Marjan Rožanc – writer, playwright and essayist
- Igor Škamperle – writer, essayist and sociologist
- Anton Martin Slomšek – poet and Roman Catholic bishop
- Jože Snoj – Catholic poet; was prohibited to publish his works during the Communist regime
- Karel Vladimir Truhlar – theologian, Jesuit priest, and mystical poet
- Josip Vandot – fiction writer
- Anton Vodnik – literary theorist and poet
- France Vodnik – essayist and poet
- Valentin Vodnik – 18th-century poet and Roman Catholic priest

=== Spanish language ===
- Juan de Albi – Carthusian writer (d. 1591)
- Jaime Balmes – Spanish Catholic priest; known for his political and philosophical writing
- Gustavo Adolfo Bécquer
- Giannina Braschi
- Antonio Burgos
- Pedro Calderón de la Barca
- Ramón de Campoamor
- Leonardo Castellani – Jesuit priest
- Juan de Castellanos – Criollo poet, soldier and Catholic priest
- Francisca Josefa de la Concepción – Criollo mystic and Poor Clare nun
- Alonso Cueto
- Juan Donoso Cortés
- Gerardo Diego
- José María Gironella
- Nicolás Gómez Dávila
- Luis de Góngora – Spanish Baroque lyric poet and priest
- Baltasar Gracián – Spanish Jesuit priest, baroque prose writer and philosopher
- Fernando de Herrera
- Saint John of the Cross – Spanish mystic, Discalced Carmelite friar and priest; major figure of the Roman Counter-Reformation; Roman Catholic saint
- Juana Inés de la Cruz – self-taught scholar and poet of the Baroque school; Hieronymite nun
- María Ignacia – Colombian Poor Clare nun, poet and writer
- Pedro Laín Entralgo
- Luis de León – Spanish lyric poet, Augustinian friar, theologian and academic; active during the Spanish Golden Age
- Osvaldo Lira – Chilean philosopher and theologian; priest of the Congregation of the Sacred Hearts of Jesus and Mary
- Lope de Vega – KOM
- Ramiro de Maeztu
- Juan Jose Marti
- Marcelino Menéndez y Pelayo
- Miguel de Cervantes Saavedra
- Leopoldo Panero
- José María Pemán
- José María de Pereda
- Juan Pérez de Montalbán – Spanish Catholic priest, dramatist, poet and novelist
- Dionisio Ridruejo
- Fernando Rielo
- Vicente Risco
- Pedro Sainz Rodríguez
- Luis Rosales
- Manuel Tamayo y Baus
- Maria Nestora Tellez – writer of Staurofila; Mexican female Catholic teacher and writer
- Gonzalo Torrente Ballester
- Saint Teresa of Ávila – Spanish mystic, Carmelite nun and theologian; Roman Catholic saint; an author of the Counter Reformation
- Miguel de Unamuno
- Juan Vázquez de Mella
- Lizzie Velásquez
- Hugo Wast
- José Zorrilla
- Xavier Zubiri

=== Swedish language ===
- Anders Piltz – Swedish Benedictine and Latinist; scholar of Medieval Sweden
- Birgitta Trotzig – Swedish novelist; member of the Swedish Academy, chair number 6
- Gunnel Vallquist – Swedish writer; known for a translation of the seven-volume novel In Search of Lost Time by Marcel Proust
- Torgny Lindgren – Swedish writer; member of the Swedish Academy, chair number 9

=== Welsh language ===
- Richard Gwyn – Elizabethan era bard and martyr who spread the teachings of the Counter-Reformation through Welsh poetry
- Saunders Lewis – poet, dramatist, historian and leading figure in modern Welsh nationalism, a convert to Catholicism
- Dewi Nantbrân – Franciscan; wrote a catechism in Welsh
- Dom William Pugh – composed a Welsh poem in which loyalty to his king is combined with devotion to the Roman Catholic Church
- Gruffydd Robert – wrote in exile during the Elizabethan era

== Genre writing ==
=== Mystery ===
- Anthony Boucher – American science-fiction editor, mystery novelist and short- story writer; his science-fiction short story "The Quest for Saint Aquin" shows his strong commitment to the religion
- G. K. Chesterton – English lay theologian, poet, philosopher, dramatist, journalist, orator, literary and art critic, biographer, and Christian apologist; wrote several books of short stories about a priest, Father Brown, who acts as a detective
- Antonia Fraser – English writer of history, novels, biographies and detective fiction; Roman Catholic (converted with her parents as a child); caused a public scandal in 1977 by leaving her Catholic husband for Harold Pinter
- Ronald Knox – English priest and theologian; wrote six mystery novels
- Ralph McInerny – American novelist; wrote over thirty books, including the Father Dowling mystery series; taught for over forty years at the University of Notre Dame, where he was the director of the Jacques Maritain Center

=== Science fiction and fantasy ===
- Diana Gabaldon – American author of the Outlander series of books
- Michael F. Flynn – American science fiction novelist, author of Eifelheim
- R. A. Lafferty – American science-fiction and fantasy novelist; by many accounts a devout and conservative Catholic
- Murray Leinster – American science-fiction and alternate-history novelist
- Walter M. Miller, Jr. – American science-fiction novelist and short-story writer; convert, then ex-Catholic; known for the novel A Canticle for Leibowitz (1960) and other Catholic-themed works
- Michael D. O'Brien – Canadian Catholic novelist; works include the "Father Elijah" series
- Tim Powers – American science-fiction and fantasy novelist; self-avowed Catholic in interviews
- Fred Saberhagen – American science-fiction and fantasy novelist and short-story writer
- J. R. R. Tolkien – English writer, poet, philologist and university professor; worked on a translation of the Book of Job in the Catholic Jerusalem Bible, and saw his novel The Lord of the Rings as deeply informed by his Catholicism
- Gene Wolfe – American science fiction and fantasy writer; convert; a recent story of his in Asimov's Science Fiction magazine concerned a Catholic holy card
- John C. Wright – American science-fiction and fantasy novelist; convert; known for his The Golden Age trilogy novels and the Orphans of Chaos trilogy novels; Nebula Award finalist for his fantasy novel Orphans of Chaos –
- Rosamund Hodge – American novelist and short-story writer; works include "Cruel Beauty" and "Crimson Bound"

== Screenwriters ==
*William Peter Blatty
- Frank Cottrell Boyce – the comedy-drama film Millions (2004) is perhaps the most "Catholic" film he has written
- Robert Bresson – adapted the novel Diary of a Country Priest (1936), by Georges Bernanos, to the film of the same name (1951); namesake of the Pontifical Council for Culture's "Robert Bresson Prize in Film"; influenced by Jansenism
- Johnny Byrne – wrote episodes of the science-fiction television series Space: 1999 (1975–1977) and Doctor Who
- Frank Capra
- Myles Connolly
- Joe Eszterhas
- Federico Fellini
- John Ford
- Mel Gibson
- Alfred Hitchcock
- Leo McCarey – wrote the drama film The Bells of St. Mary's (1945) and directed the musical comedy-drama film Going My Way (1944)
- Sean McNamara
- Paul Morrissey - best known of writer and director of films produced by Andy Warhol, including Flesh (1968 film) and Trash (1970 film)
- Ermanno Olmi
- Eric Rohmer – French New Wave director and screenwriter and editor of Cahiers du Cinéma. His filmography shows an interest in Catholicism, and he personally attended Holy Mass every week.
- Martin Scorsese
- Luchino Visconti
- Raoul Walsh
- Franco Zeffirelli

== See also ==
- Lists of Roman Catholics
- Lists of writers
