= Spiral arm (disambiguation) =

A spiral arm is a region of stars that extend from the center of barred and unbarred spiral galaxies.

Spiral arm may also refer to:

- Spiral Arm (game), a space-based play-by-mail game
- Spiral Arm series, a novel series by author Michael Flynn
