= Michael Flynn bibliography =

List of works by Michael Flynn

A list of the works of American science fiction author Michael Flynn.

== Novels ==
- Flynn, Michael (1990). In the country of the blind. New York: Baen Books.
- Flynn, Michael; Larry Niven & Jerry Pournelle (1991). Fallen angels. Baen Books.
- Flynn, Michael (2001). In the country of the blind (Revised ed.). New York: Tor. ISBN 9780312874445.
- The Wreck of the River of Stars (2003)
- Eifelheim (2006) (Hugo nomination 2007)
- Flynn, Michael F. (2024). In the belly of The Whale. Rockville, MD: Caezik SF & Fantasy.

=== Firestar Universe ===
Firestar Series

- Firestar (1996)
- Rogue Star (1998)
- Lodestar (2000)
- Falling Stars (2001)

Spiral Arm Series

- The January Dancer (2008)
- Up Jim River (2010)
- In the Lion's Mouth (2012)
- On the Razor's Edge (2013)

== Short fiction ==
Collections

- The Nanotech Chronicles (1991)
- The Forest of Time and other stories (1997)
- Captive Dreams (2013)

Stories

Title	Year	First published	Reprinted/collected	Notes
Eifelheim	1986			Nominee for Best Novella Hugo Award, 1987.
The Journeyman : in the Stone House	2014	Flynn, Michael F. (June 2014). "The Journeyman : in the Stone House". Analog Science Fiction and Fact. 134 (6): 29–45.		Nominee for Hugo Award for Best Novelette.

- "The Forest of Time" (1987) (Hugo Best Novella nominee, 1988)
- "The Adventure of the Laughing Clone" (1988)
- "From the corner of the eye" Analog 113/13 (November 1993)
- "Melodies of the heart" Analog 114/1&2 (January 1994 (Hugo Best Novella nominee, 1995)
- "The promise of God" F&SF 88/3 [526] (Mar 1995)
- "House of Dreams" (October–November 1997, Asimov's Science Fiction) won a Theodore Sturgeon Award in 1998.
- "Southern Strategy" (2002) Published in the collection, Alternate Generals II, 2002, ed. Harry Turtledove, Baen Books
- "The Ensorcelled ATM" (2005) Published in the anthology The Enchanter Completed, 2005, ed. Harry Turtledove, Baen Books
- "Dawn, and Sunset, and the Colours of the Earth" (Asimov's October/November 2006), Hugo nomination 2007
- "Quaestiones Super Caelo et Mundo" Analog 127/7&8 (July/August 2007), Sidewise Award for Alternate History
- "Sand and Iron" Analog 128/7&8 (July/August 2008) : 86-100
- "Where the Winds are all Asleep" Analog 129/10 (October 2009) : 8-32
- "On Rickety Thistlethwaite" Analog 130/1&2 (January/February 2010) : 62-71
- "Cargo" Analog 130/6 (Jun 2010) : 78-85
- "The Frog Prince" Analog 131/1&2 (January/February 2011) : 126-147
- "The Iron Shirts" Tor.com (May 2011)
- "The Journeyman: On the Short-Grass Prairie" Analog 132/10 (October 2012)
- "The Journeyman: At the Bluffs of Sinjin Trell" Analog Vol. XCII Nos. 3 & 4 (March/April 2022)

== Non fiction ==
- "De revolutione scientarium in 'media tempestas'" Analog 127/7&8 (Jul/Aug 2007)
- "The great Ptolemaic smackdown and down-and-dirty mud-wrassle". Analog. 133 (1&2): 14–27. Jan–Feb 2013.
- "The autumn of modern science". Guest Editorial. Analog. 136 (4): 4–8. April 2016.
