= Vonne van der Meer =

Dutch writer and playwright

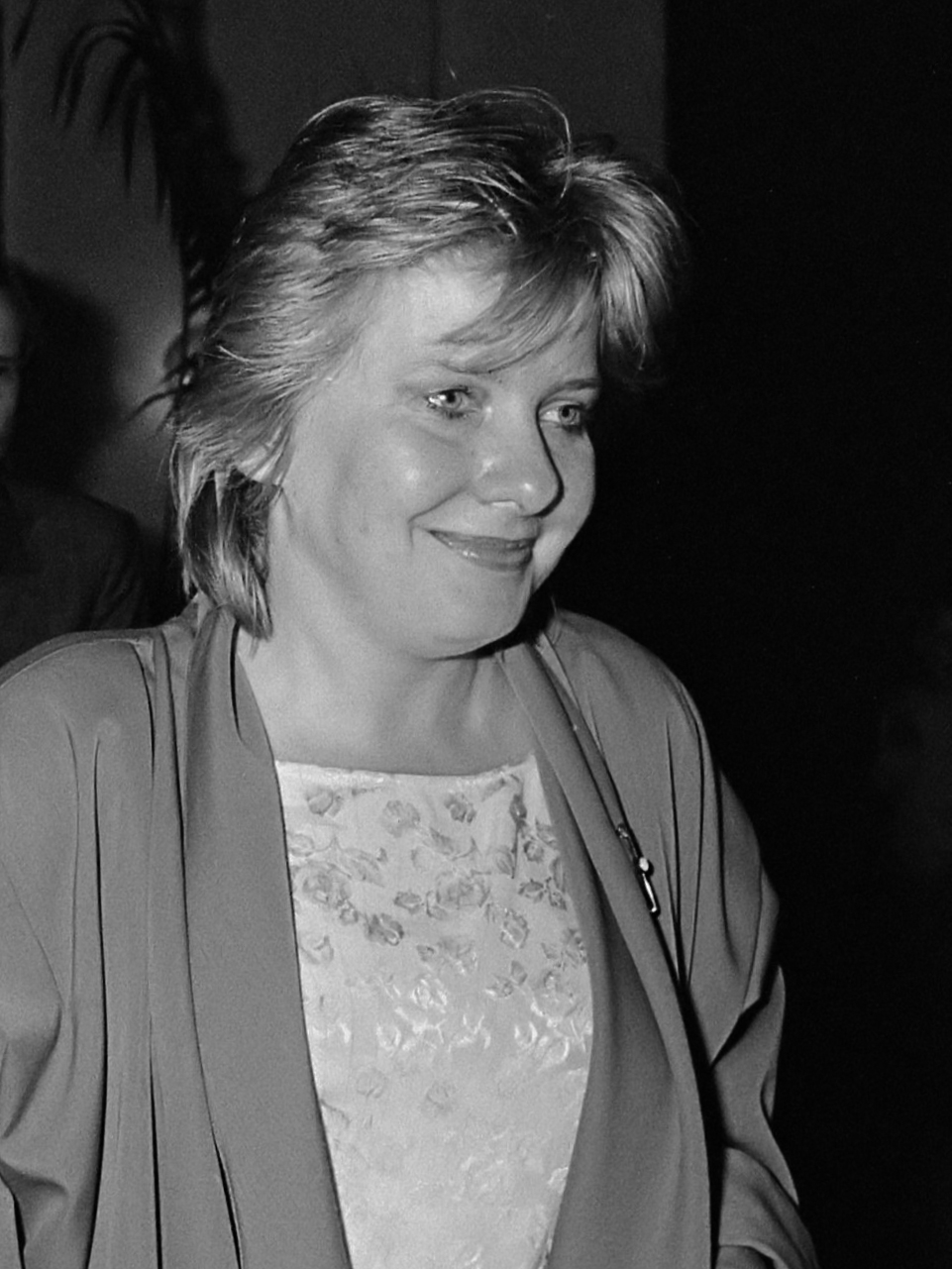
Vonne van der Meer (1986)

Vonne van der Meer (born 15 December 1952 in Eindhoven) is a Dutch prose writer and playwright. Since 1978 Van der Meer has been married to Dutch writer Willem Jan Otten, together they have two sons.

== Biography ==
Van der Meer attended the Amsterdam Theater School. In 1976, De Behandeling (The Treatment), a monologue written for theatre, was played by Toneelgroep Centrum. In 1978 van der Meer assisted Frans Marijnen as a stage director at the Ro-Theater. She also had her director debut at this theater. A year later she had her official director's debut at Fact with Stella bij Goethe. She continued her director role for another 10 years with various theatre groups such as Toneelgroep Centrum, Theater Baal, De Haagse Comedie en RO-Theater. In 1996, her play Weiger nooit een dans at Ro-Theater.

In 1985, she published her first book: Het limonadegevoel en andere verhalen (The Soft Drink Feeling and other Stories) for which she received the Geertjan Lubberhuizenprijs. Her breakthrough book was considered Einlandgasten (Island Guests). This book consists of 6 short stories about a holiday house on the island of Vlieland. This became the first in a trilogy followed by Avondboot (Night Boat) and Laatste Seizoen (Last Season). These books have been filmed by Karim Traïdia

In 1994, Vonne van der Meer converted to Roman Catholicism. Some years later, Willem Jan Otten, her spouse, also converted.

Since September 2017, van der Meer has been chairman of PEN Nederland, part of PEN International, a writers' organization that is committed to freedom of expression.

Some of her books are translated in German, Spanish and Bulgarian.

== Bibliography ==
- 1985 - Het limonadegevoel en andere verhalen (stories)
- 1987 - Een warme rug (novel)
- 1989 - De reis naar het kind (novel)
- 1991 - Zo is hij (novel)
- 1993 - Nachtgoed (stories)
- 1995 - Spookliefde (novella)
- 1996 - Weiger nooit een dans (play)
- 1999 - Eilandgasten (novel, adapted for the screen under the same title in 2006)
- 2001 - Avondboot (novel, adapted for the screen under the same title in 2007)
- 2002 - Laatste seizoen (novel)
- 2004 - Ik verbind u door (novel)
- 2006 - Niemand op heel Vlieland (novella)
- 2007 - Take 7 (novel)
- 2009 - Zondagavond (novel)
- 2011 - De vrouw met de sleutel (novel)

== Awards ==
- 1985 - Geertjan Lubberhuizenprijs (Het limonadegevoel en andere verhalen)
- 1986 - ANV-Visser Neerlandia-prijs (Besloten kring)
