= Carol Jackson Robinson =

American author (1911–2002)

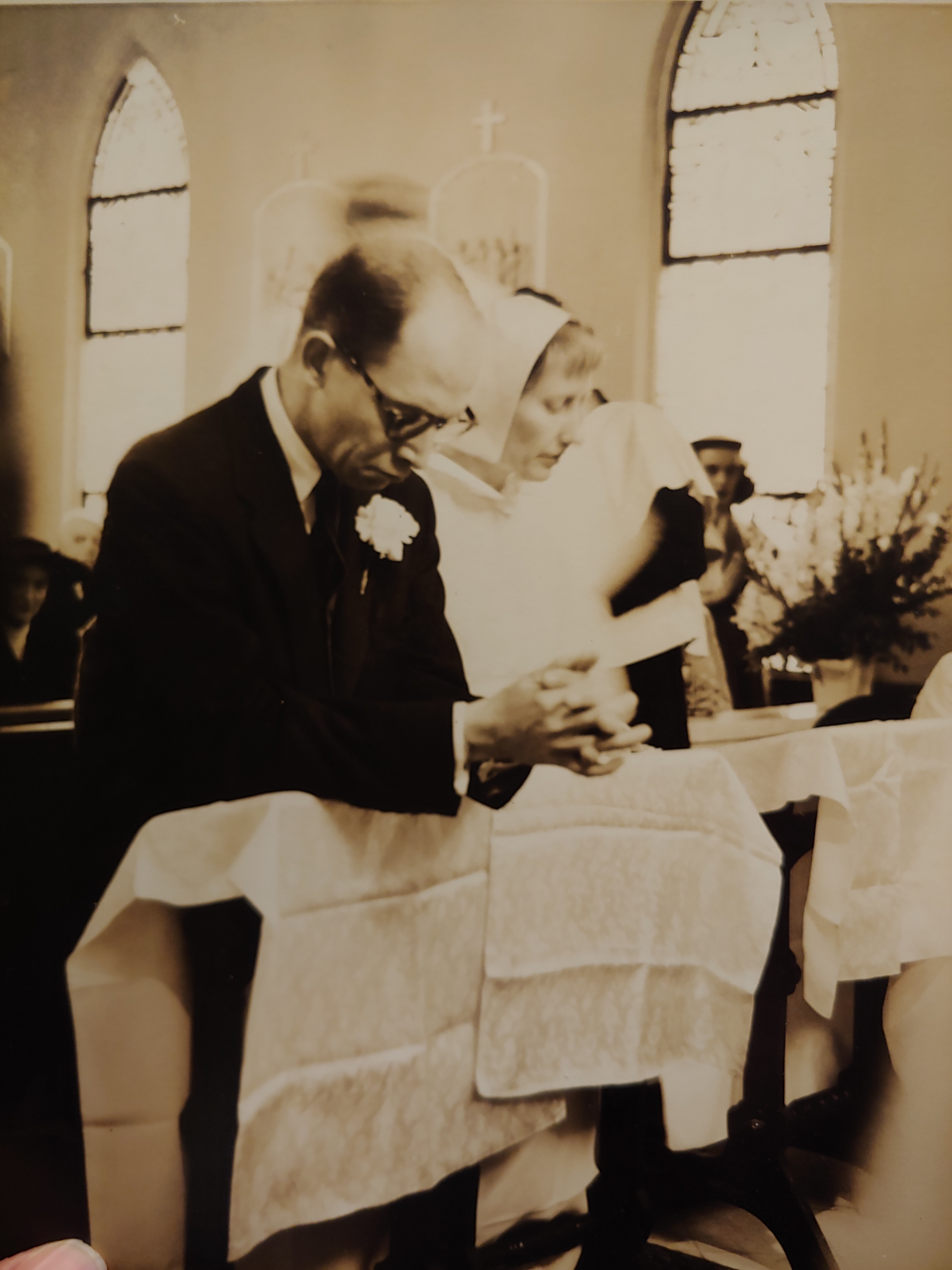
Marriage of Carol Jackson and Maurie Leigh Robinson, 1956.

Carol Jackson Robinson (5 May 1911 – 23 August 2002) was an American Catholic writer, editor, and public speaker. She often published under the pseudonym Peter Michaels.

== Early life and education ==
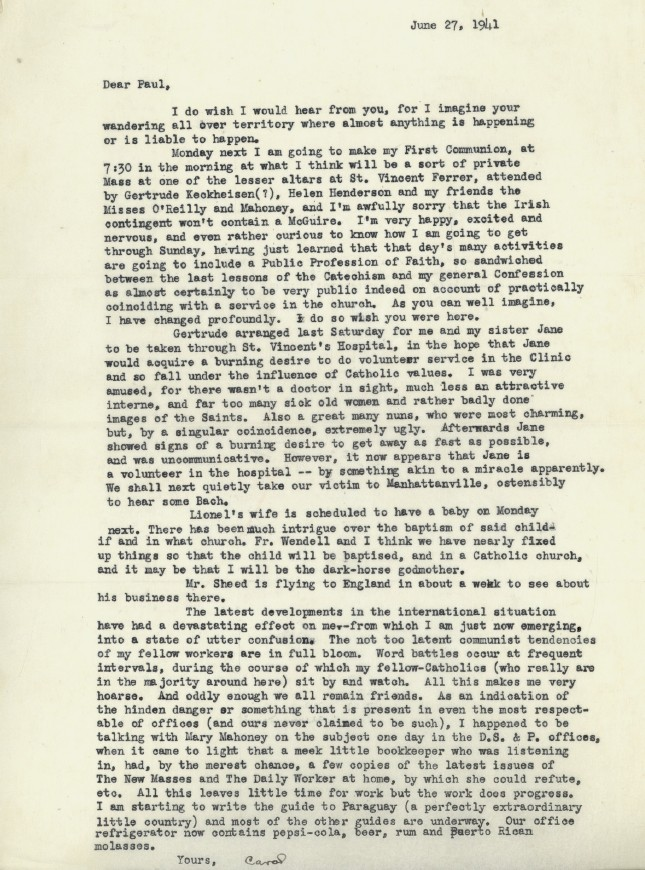
Letter to Paul McGuire about her First Holy Communion, dated July 27, 1941.

She was born in Oshkosh, Wisconsin and grew up in West Redding, Connecticut. Her father had been general counsel to the American Gas Association. Carol Jackson attended Wellesley College, became an atheist, and interrupted her studies for a few years before graduating in 1937. After attending a lecture on Catholic Action by Paul McGuire in New York City, she converted to Roman Catholicism in 1941. She married Maurie Leigh Robinson, one-time writer for NBC, in 1956. She and her husband had no children of their own. Ten years later, she returned to school and received an MA in Theology in 1967 from St. John's University in Queens, NY. In 1975, she won the "Wanderer Award" for her work in promoting the work of St. Thomas Aquinas. Later in life, she attended services at a Society of St. Pius X chapel in Connecticut, beginning around 1990.

== Speaker and writer ==
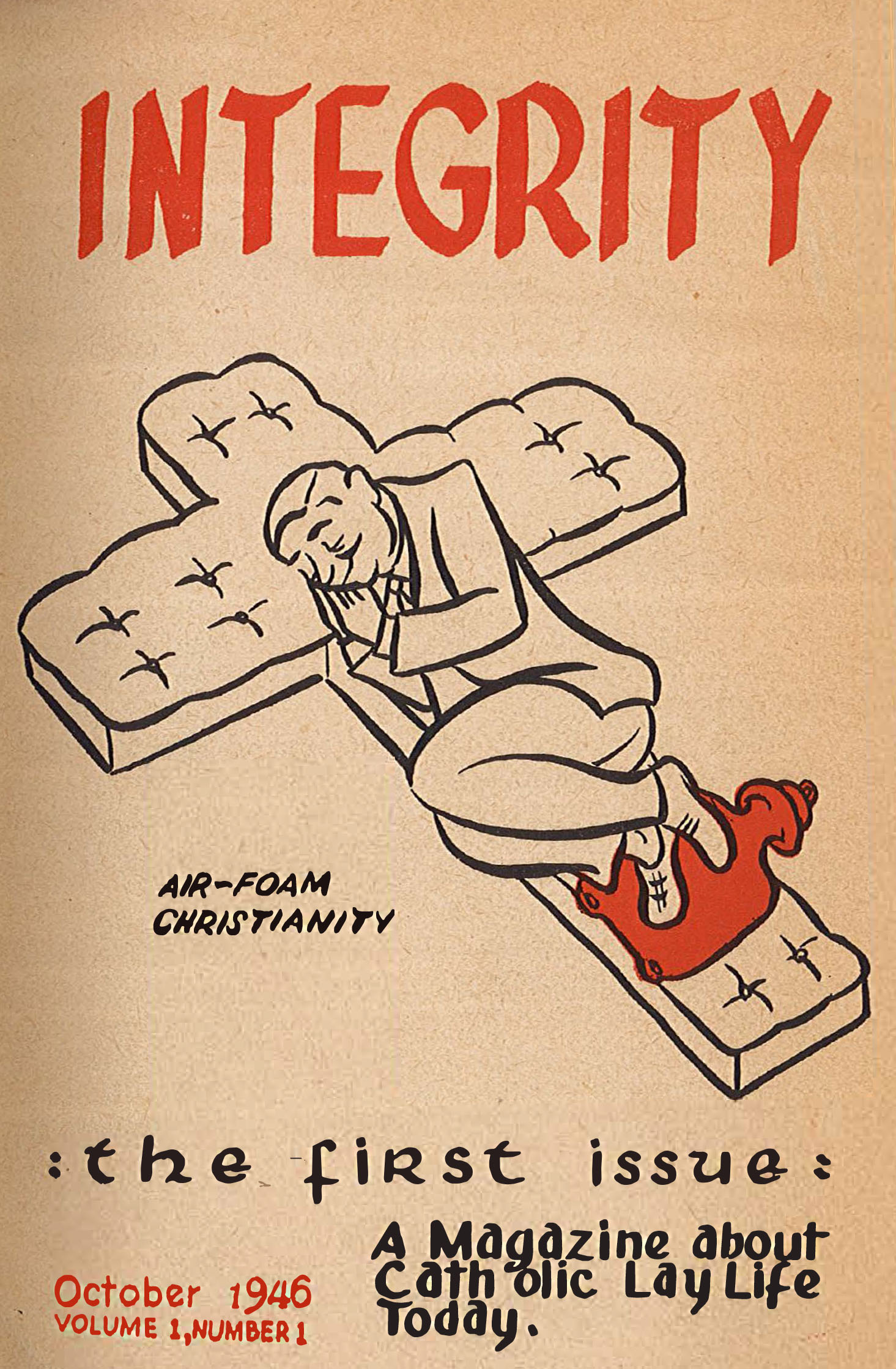
First issue of Integrity (October 1946)

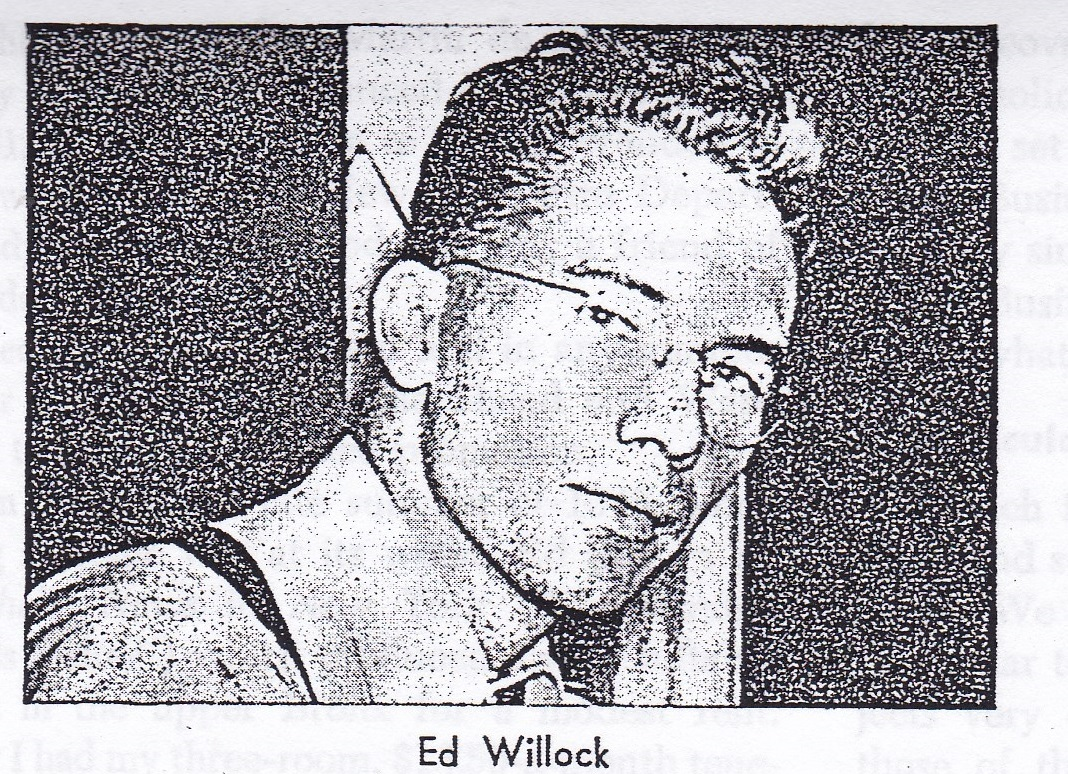
Ed Willock. Catholic cartoonist and co-founder of Integrity (1946–1956).

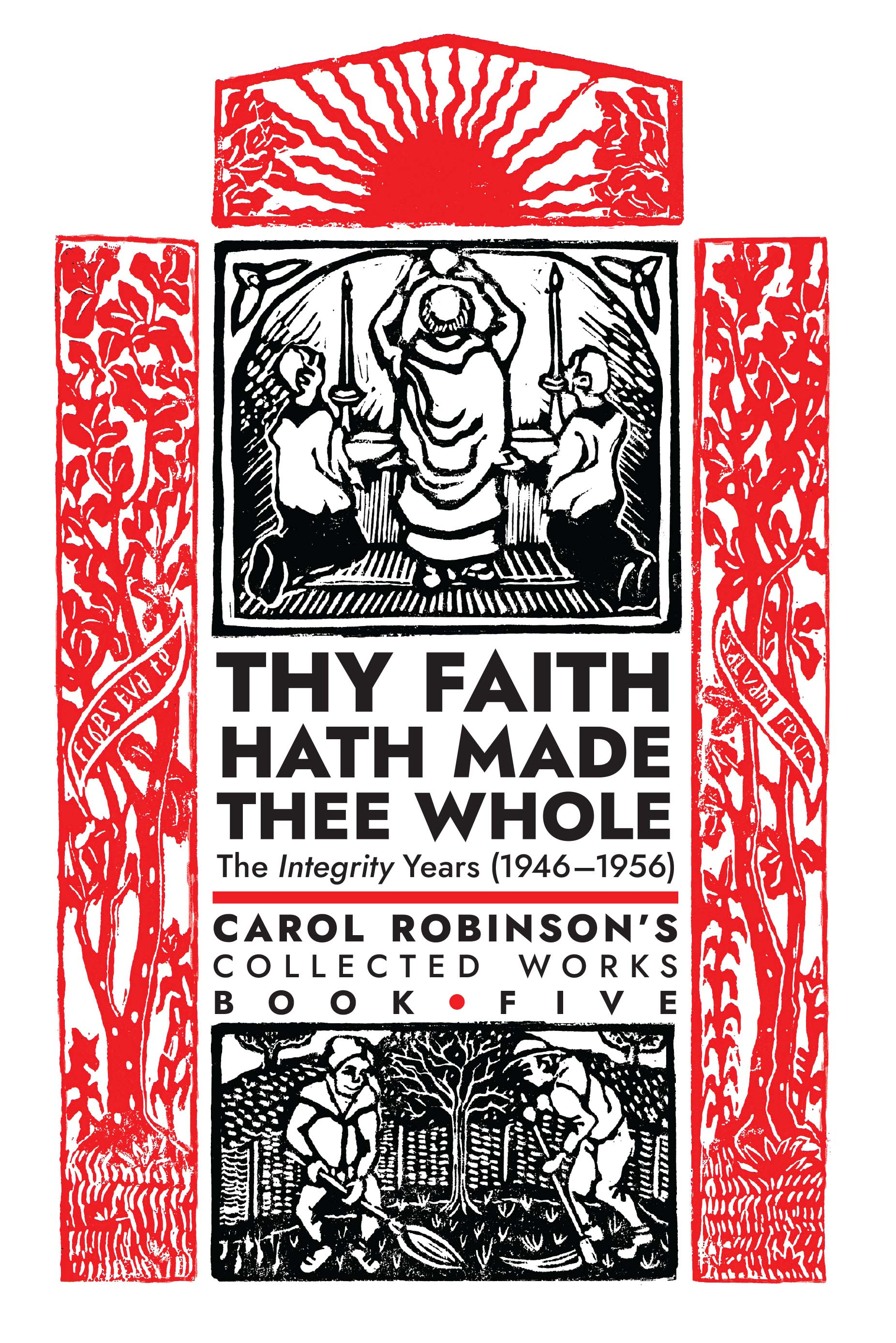
Front cover of the first-ever collection of the entire writings of Carol Robinson from the Integrity magazine.

Carol Jackson wrote for The Torch, where she met fellow author Ed Willock. Together, they founded Integrity magazine in October, 1946. Over the course of the next ten years, the magazine was a forum for young Catholic writers. Jackson worked for the magazine until 1952. Thomas Merton, later a widely-read Trappist monk, published several articles in Integrity. The Dominican friar James Mark Egan served as Integrity's theological consultant and vetted articles to insure their conformity to Catholic teaching. He was later appointed head of the theology department at St. Mary's, Notre Dame. A visitor to the Integrity offices described Jackson in detail: "Then I was asked to lunch with editors, staff, and visitors, the community. There was Carol Jackson, slim, young, immaculately groomed and well, "spiritual looking". [...] The conversation was serious but not dour. [...] Carol seemed to be the dominant personality at table.

As a writer, she used the pseudonym Peter Michaels. After her death, some books were re-issued using her real name. In his review of This Perverse Generation, which was a critique of tepid Catholicism in American culture, J.F.T. Prince claimed the book was just as apt as a critique of British culture. The advertisement for the book in The Tablet claimed: "Peter Michaels' book will give you a shock."

From 1971 to 1987 she wrote over 60 articles for The Wanderer including a six-part critique of Karl Rahner.

Jackson traveled widely to hold public speeches, often about Thomas Aquinas and his relevance for contemporary culture. She coined the term nunk, using it to criticize laypeople who thought that the only form of holiness was to imitate nuns and monks "for want of a clear idea of the lay role."

== Publications ==
- Breaking the Chains of Mediocrity: Carol Robinson's Marianist Articles [published by Arouca Press in 2019; originally published as five articles for The Marianist from 1947–1948]
- Designs for Christian Living [republished by Arouca Press in 2020; Originally published in 1947]
- This Perverse Generation [republished as the third edition by Arouca Press in 2020; first edition (1949), second edition (2006)]
- Thy Faith Hath Made Thee Whole: The Integrity Years (1946-1956) [publication of her complete articles, book reviews, and editorials for Integrity by Arouca Press in 2021]
- The Salt of the Earth [republished by Arouca Press in 2024, Collection of Lone Star Catholic articles from Austin, TX; 1958–1959]
- The Eightfold Kingdom Within: Essays on the Beatitudes & The Gifts of the Holy Ghost [republished by Arouca Press in 2019, Collection of articles and pamphlets from Ave Maria, 1962–1963]
- An Embattled Mind, In Defense of St. Thomas: The Post-Conciliar Years (The Collected Wanderer Articles: 1971–1987) [forthcoming 2025 title]
- My Life with Thomas Aquinas [selected articles from Integrity; originally published by The Angelus Press; now in its third edition]
