= Staurofila =

1889 novel by Maria Nestora Tellez

- Author: María Nestora Téllez
- Original title: Staurofila. Precioso cuento alegórico
- Language: Spanish
- Genre: Novel, Allegorical novel
- Publisher: Grupo Editorial Exodo
- Publication date: 1893
- Publication place: Mexico
- Pages: 280
- ISBN: 9707370408

Staurofila is a novel composed at the end of the 19th century by the Mexican author Maria Nestora Tellez (1828–1890), who described it as an allegorical tale. Because Maria Nestora Tellez suffered a childhood illness that left her blind, she dictated the story to her assistants. It was first published in Spanish in 1889, anonymously, at the request of the same author, and was released again in 1893 with the mention of the creator, after her death. Since then, it has been published in Mexico on several occasions until today. It has been described as "a novel of adventures with chivalrous features, an extensive fairy tale, and a hagiographic novel immersed in the hispanic, medieval and Renaissance literary tradition.".

The novel is a didactic narrative that the author told her students to allegorically describe the principles of Christianity, as well as the spiritual growth, and even some eschatological themes. It consists of an allegorical story that describes the daily struggle to maintain freedom, love and life, which are considered gifts of God. By its style, it could be considered an analogous and previous work of those with a relatively similar allegorical style, like the Chronicles of Narnia or The Lord of the Rings, but with a clearer and more direct symbolism. It has been influenced by the Song of Songs and the works of St. Francis de Sales, St. John of the Cross and St. Teresa of Ávila.

== Plot summary ==
The King of Lights is a very good sovereign, loved by everyone in his kingdom. One day, he chooses one of his subjects, Protaner, to take care of the prison where he keeps imprisoned a large seven heads serpent, the Serpus. In return, he gives Protaner wealth, a house, and a good social and economic position. Protaner lives happily, marries a beautiful woman named Protogina, and together they have Staurofila as daughter, who, due to her beauty, is chosen to be the future wife of the Prince of Lights, Helios Dicaias, when they both grow up. Unfortunately, Protaner and Protogina betray the king's trust and, by a trick of the Serpus, they let it out. While escaping, the Serpus leaves little Staurofila wounded badly and with a horrible mark on his neck. The king is enraged and declares the death penalty for the marriage. However, the prince goes out to defend them and offers to capture the Serpus to redeem the guilty ones. The king accepts but, until the Serpus is to be captured, he expels Protaner's family from the kingdom and sends them to the Desert of Tears. There go Protaner, Protogina, little Staurofila and Filautia, the old babysitter, who, after smelling some poisonous flowers in the desert, gets crazy and forgets the beautiful Kingdom of Lights. Over time, Protaner and Protogina get lost and never return home, so Filautia asks for asylum, for her and for the girl, to Pseudo-Epythropus, a rich local man, interested only in his earnings, who has two daughters, Peirasy and Proscope. Pseudo-Epythropus notices that Staurofila is very beautiful and receives her with the intention of give her in marriage when she grows up, and thus get some economic or social benefits.

Years later, Staurofila becomes a beautiful young woman. One day, while she walks alone, she meets a gentleman named Buletes, sent by the Prince of Lights. Buletes reminds Staurofila her origin and her commitment to the Prince of Lights, who still loves her and looks for her. Buletes shows Staurofila a portrait of the prince and asks her if she would still want to meet the prince and eventually marry him. Staurofila accepts. However, at the same time, the Serpus speaks with Pseudo-Epythropus and offers him great riches in exchange for making Staurofila marry Apollyon, the Prince of Black Shadows, who is a protégé of the Serpus. This Prince of Black Shadows does not really love Staurofila, and if he wants to marry her it is only to take her away from the Prince of Lights, his rival. So, if the Prince of Black Shadows achieves his goal, he will discard Staurofila or imprison her for life. From this point of the story, a series of adventures begin, in which Staurofila hesitates between her love for the two princes. This causes the two rivals to confront with their armies on several occasions and places. Through the successive chapters, one can observe the stages by which the love of Staurofila for the Prince of Lights grows and matures, while the love and mercy of the prince remain constant. Staurofila understands more and more that her role in this war is to respond to the love of the Prince of Lights, to trust in his mercy, to discern good from evil, and to be prepared to resist temptations. In the end, the spiritual growth and the increasing maturity of Staurofila allow her to reach the definitive union with the Prince of Lights.

== Symbolism of characters, places and some objects ==
Name	Meaning given in the novel	Symbolism
Staurofila	Lover of the Cross	Human Soul
Filautia	Self-love	Human body
Helios Dicaias (Prince of Lights, medical doctor)	Sun of Justice	Jesus Christ
King of Lights		God the Father
Buletes	Counselor	Spiritual Counselor (priest or religious superior), Church guided by the Holy Spirit, angel (in the anticlerical environment in Mexico after its Reform War, it is understandable that the note of the book identifies Buletes not with a priest or with the Church, but with an angel).
Quejaritomene	Full of Grace	Saint Mary
Theophorus	The one who bears God	Saint Joseph
Warriors and wise men		Saints and martyrs of the Church
Shepherdesses		Religious women, devouts
Villagers		Faithful Christian and other "good will" non-Christian people (at first many did not identify the doctor as the Son of the King)
Roe deer		Inspirations from the Divine Grace or from the Guardian Angel
Protaner	First man	Adam, father.
Protogina	First woman	Eve, mother.
Proscope	Stumble	Temptation.
Peirasy	Temptation	Envy (Pleasure to cause envy in others)
Pseudo-Epythropus	False Custodian	The "world" (understood as the socially accepted evil).
Apollyon	Destroyer	Abaddon, Antichrist
The Serpus	Snake	Satan, Lucifer, the Devil
Prodotes	Traitor	Traitor
Tree of Perfumes		The Cross of Jesus
Kingdom of Lights		Heaven, Paradise
Desert of Tears		The Earth (earthly reality)
Castle of the Black Shadows		Life in sin, or close to it.
Dungeons of the Castle of the Black Shadows		Hell
Mount of the Three Mansions		Prayer. See and compare to The Interior Castle (also known as The Mansions) of St. Teresa of Ávila.
--The Cave		Retreat, the prayer of recollection. See and compare to The Interior Castle (also known as The Mansions) of St. Teresa of Ávila.
--The Castle of the flank		Other prayer levels of stillness and contentment. See and compare to The Interior Castle (also known as The Mansions) of St. Teresa of Ávila.
--The Castle of the Summit		Mystical prayer of union with God. See and compare to The Interior Castle (also known as The Mansions) of St. Teresa of Ávila.
Mount of Myrrh	Prison for criminals sentenced for their crimes to extract myrrh from the tree of perfumes	Suffering, sacrifice. Union to Jesus Christ in suffering and sacrifice.
Field of the Three Mines	Jewelry extraction and polishing place	Purgatory?
Long and thin bridge without handrails, on deep and dark precipice		Death
Mark of the Serpus on the neck of Staurofila	Mark left by the breath of the Serpus when escaping by the disobedience of Protaner and Protogina	Original sin, concupiscence.
Awl		Abnegation act or sacrifice.
Wines, flowers and jewels of the Black Shadows	Objects Staurofila should be taken care of in the Castle of the Black Shadows..	Pleasures, pride, greed.
Lamp, fan and necklace given by Quejaritomene	Objects given to Staurofila by Quejaritomene in order to be a help on the way.	Light to discern good from evil, fan to drive away attraction to evil, Rosary.

== Structure ==
Staurofila is divided into a prologue, 33 chapters divided into three parts, and an epilogue.

== Reception and criticism ==
The work has attracted readers originally within circles of religious education, later to public interested in the mythological and epic genres, and recently to people interested in works of Latin American women of 19th century. Its novelistic formula has been difficult to classify and considered as unconventional and atypical, both by the mythological plot and its theological symbolism, different from the narrative conventions prevailing Mexico during that time, as by the fact of having been developed by a blind woman, within a society with a rigid patriarchal structure. This Is what has recently attracted people interested in works by Latin American female authors. Although there is a tendency to identify the protagonist as the ideal woman from the time the novel was written, Staurofila actually represents the soul in general, from both women and men. In recent years, from the academic and literary point of view, more extensive work has been done regarding analysis, exegesis and hermeneutic reflection of this novel, based on given methodological proposals, such as that of Dr. Gloria Prado-Garduño.
