= Anna T. Sadlier =

Canadian writer

Anna Teresa Sadlier
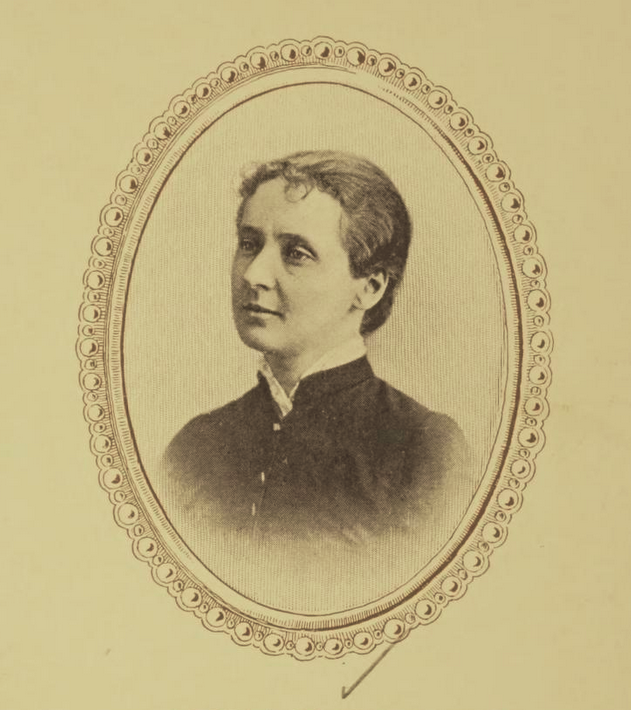
- Photo in A Round table of the representative American Catholic novelists, 1897
- Born: 1854; Montreal, Canada
- Died: April 16, 1932 (aged 77–78); Ottawa, Ontario, Canada
- Resting place: Notre Dame cemetery, Ottawa, Canada
- Occupations: writer; translator
- Parent: Mary Anne Sadlier
- Writing career
- Language: English
- Period: 1875–1918
- Genres: novels; children's literature
- Subject: Catholicism

Anna T. Sadlier (1854 – April 16, 1932) was a Canadian writer whose novels were of a Catholic nature, and whose works numbered over forty volumes. She began to write when she was about eighteen. Her published works include a number of translations from the French, Italian, and Spanish.

== Early life and education ==
Anna Teresa (sometimes "Theresa") Sadlier was born in Montreal, Canada, 1854. Her father was James Sadlier and her mother was Mary Anne Sadlier.

Her education was received at various schools in that city, and completed at the Villa Maria, the principal Convent of the Congregation of Notre Dame of Montreal.

== Career ==
Like her mother, she spent about equal portions of her life in New York City and Montreal. She was a frequent contributor in prose and verse to most of the U.S. Catholic periodicals as well as to some English and Canadian ones. She wrote a great many short stories. One of her earliest literary ventures was Seven Years and Mair, a novelette published by the Harpers in their "Half Hour Series". Her principal original published works were Names that Live and Women of Catholicity, two volumes of biography. Sadlier spent a lot of time on these and they possessed a historical point of view. In two of the sketches which were distinctively American, she drew largely from The Jesuit Relations and the Memoirs of Père Olier, and she had the advantage of access to the annals of the Ursulines of Quebec and of the Congregation of Notre Dame of Montreal.

Among her other original works are two stirring historical romances, The Red Inn of St. Lyphar, which finds its plot and its adventures in the days of the French Revolution and the Rising of La Vendee; and The True Story of Master Gerard, in which the background is provided by Colonial New York and the Leisler conspiracy.

Perhaps Sadlier's best work was accomplished in juvenile fiction. In The Mysterious Doorway and The mystery of Hornby Hall, she provided, as the titles imply, a mystery, while the children in The Talisman and A Summer at Woodville are lifelike, interesting, lovable youngsters, and the heroine of Pauline Archer is a Catholic cousin of Rebecca of Sunnybrook Farm. Her other books are Ethel Hamilton and The King's Page.

Sadlier's translations from the French and Italian include: Ubaldo and Irene, Mathilda of Canossa, Idols, Monk's Pardon, The Outlaw of Camargue, The Wonders of Lourdes, The Old Chest, Consolations for the Afflicted, A Thought of the Sacred Heart for Every Day of the Year, Words of St. Alphonsus, Lucille, or the Young Flower-Maker, The Two Brothers, Augustine, or the Mysterious Beggar, Ivan, or The Leper's Son, The Dumb Boy of Fribourg, and The Recluse of Rambouillet.

== Personal life ==
Sadlier was the founder of the Ottawa Tabernacle Society. She resided in Ottawa, Ontario for 29 years, before dying there at her home, April 16, 1932. Interment was at Ottawa's Notre Dame cemetery.

== Style ==
Of her work it may be said as she says of the writings of Marie de l'Incarnation, "it possesses rare excellence in a literary point of view, and as a historical record is unsurpassed for clearness and accuracy. The style is delicate and spiritual, while forcible and consistent; the work is marked by a keenness of perception, a subtle grasp of points at issue, an attention to detail, and a breadth of thought embracing the whole extent of what lies before it."

== Selected works ==
- Seven Years and Mair
- Names that Live
- Women of Catholicity
- Ethel Hamilton
- The King's Page
- The Red Inn of St. Lyphar
- The True Story of Master Gerard

=== Translations ===
- Ubaldo and Irene
- Mathilda of Canossa
- Idols
- Monk's Pardon
- The Outlaw of Camargue
- The Wonders of Lourdes
- The Old Chest
- Consolations for the Afflicted
- A Thought of the Sacred Heart for Every Day of the Year
- Words of St. Alphonsus
- Lucille, or the Young Flower-Maker
- The Two Brothers
- Augustine, or the Mysterious Beggar
- Ivan, or The Leper's Son
- The Dumb Boy of Fribourg
- The Recluse of Rambouillet
