= Grażyna Miller =

Polish poet and translator

Grażyna Miller (29 January 1957 – 17 August 2009) was a Polish poet and translator who lived in Italy.

Miller lived in Italy where she wrote poems and translated publications from Polish into Italian. She was also a literary critic whose work was published by the most prestigious Italian press media. Her most notable accomplishment was the translation of "Roman Triptych" (Trittico romano (Meditazioni) by Pope John Paul II). This book was published by the Libreria Editrice Vaticana and, on 6 March 2003, presented by the then Joseph Cardinal Ratzinger.

== Biography ==
Grażyna Miller, born in Jedwabne, Poland, started to write poetry in her early childhood, exactly at the age of seven. During her high school years she incessantly wrote poetry while continuing her studies. Her passions were literature and pedagogy, and soon after finishing her studies she started to teach Polish literature.

In 1983, she moved to Italy. From the beginning of her stay she started to study the Italian language at the University for Foreigners of Siena in Tuscany. During her stay in Sicily (1990–1999) she distinguished herself for her cooperation with the Polish-Sicilian Association by promoting her native culture, the arts and literature. She currently resides in Rome where she has become a journalist and she writes for a few literature inspired newspapers and cultural magazines, such as the "Corriere Romano" (The Roman Courier), "La Scena Illustrata" (The Illustrated Scene) and "Il Giornale dei Poeti" (The Poets' Journal). She is studying and translating a variety of contemporary authors, but first of all she is translating Carol Woityla's poetry.

In January 2003, she translated to Italian the "Trittico Romano.Meditazioni" (The Roman Triptych: Meditations) written in Polish by Pope John Paul II and published by the Vatican, with the presentation of Joseph Cardinal Ratzinger. The official inauguration took place the March 6, 2003 in the Sala Stampa of the Vatican in the presence of the author, Pope John Paul II. In 1998 she published her first collection of poems "Curriculum" which was presented in the International Book Showcase in Turin. The artist's second collections of works, "Sull'onda del respiro" (On breath's weave), was published in 2000 and presented for the first time in the honorary suite of the St.Mary of Angels Basilica, nearby Piazza Republica in Rome. The latest published collection of poems "Alibi di una farfalla" (A butterfly's alibi) was admitted to the Vatican Book Archives. This last book was presented and inaugurated in the Sicilian city of the most prominent regional authorities and the Mayor of Piazza Armerina in Sicily. In 2003 the book was also presented at the Book Showcase of Frankfurt, in Germany.

Also in Italy, Grażyna Miller received many national as well as international recognitions. Grażyna Miller received an award from the Minister of Italian Culture in 2002.

She won the international "Luigi Vanvitelli 2001" award for "her poetic creativity that and to serve as an inspiration culturally and humanists to the current generation of artists. Other awards received were: First National Award for religious poetry, first "Forum Interart" award for artists, poets and narrators and the "Fiore di Roccia" award for romantic poetry. In 2004 Grażyna Miller received the National literature and Journalism award, during which she was cited for her excellent Italian version of the Roman Triptych.

In Spain, the book received the international "Cartagena 2003" award. The book was also recognized at the Jagiellonian University in Kraków, in Poland where Grażyna Miller received the "Zloty Medal" (Golded Medal) for her crativity and her Polish-Italian involvement. At the same time she was given the international "Najlepsi Roku 2001" (Best of the Year 2001) award in her native country.

Not only Polish and Italian media such as "Zycie Warszawy", "Dziennik Polski", "L'osservatore Romano", and "Il Messaggero" are interested in Grażyna Miller, but Spanish and American newspapers write about her work as well. The Italian-American bilingual newspaper "Bel Paese" published in USA dedicated a permanent column on one of its pages to her poetry.

For some time, Grażyna Miller also read her poems live on the Italian television: RAI, local network "Antenna Sicilia" and the religious TV network Telepace transmitted live the presentation of her latest book "Alibi di una farfalla", where right after her collection of unedited works she added her translations of some of K.Wojtyla's poems. She released many interviews for both the Italian and the Polish Vatican radio stations, where her poems were read and broadcast.

Grażyna Miller was also interviewed by the national Italian radio and TV station (RAI) which dedicated considerable attention to her work.

She participated in the "International Poetry Contest – A poem for peace", organized by the Anna Kuliscioff Study Center of Turin, Italy with the participation of the Italian President, many Embassys and many international organizations where the author proved her commitment to her humanitarian mission as a poet.

== Works ==
- "Curriculum" (1988)
- "Sull'onda del respiro" ("On the Wave of Breath") (2000)
- "Alibi di una farfalla" ("Alibi of a Butterfly") (2002)

== Awards and accomplishments ==
in Italy

  - Award from the Ministry of Italian Culture 2002 – Rome
  - National Award of Press and Literature in Alghero – Donna (2004) – Sardegna Alghero
  - National Award of Religious Poetry (2001) – Benevento
  - International Award of Luigi Vanvitelli (2001) – Caserta
  - International Award Città di Marineo (2002) – Sycily Marineo

in Poland

  - International Award of "The Best of the Year 2001" and a Gold Medal from the Jagellon University in Kraków

in Spain

  - International Award of "Cartago" (2003) – Cartagena
