= Louie Verrecchio =

American writer (born 1961)

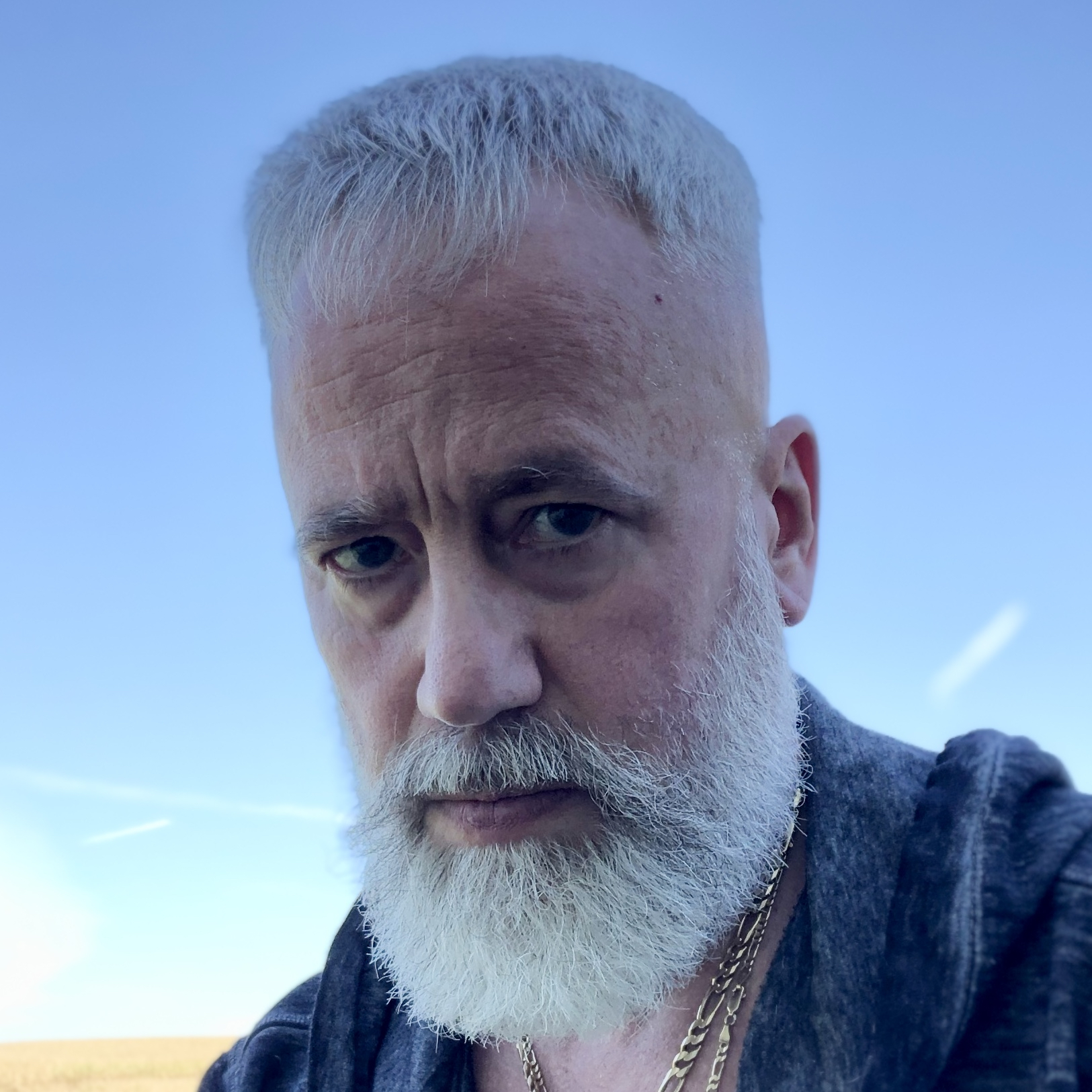
- Born: August 4, 1961 (age 65); Baltimore, Maryland, U.S.
- Education: University of Maryland
- Occupations: Author, columnist, speaker
- Years active: 2003–present
- Employer: Catholic News Agency
- Organization(s): Salve Regina Publications, Inc.
- Known for: Harvesting the Fruit of Vatican II
- Title: President and founder of Salve Regina Publications, Inc.
- Spouse: Jamie Verrecchio
- Children: 2

Louie Verrecchio, M.I. (born August 4, 1961) is a traditionalist Catholic author, columnist and speaker residing in the Archdiocese of Baltimore, MD. He is the President and Founder of Salve Regina Publications, Inc., and the author of the highly acclaimed Harvesting the Fruit of Vatican II series of conciliar document study materials which explore the teachings of the Second Vatican Council.

He is also the author of Ten Things Every Catholic Should Know About Vatican II and the book And With Your Spirit: Recovering a Sense of the Sacred in the Roman Missal, 3rd Edition.

== Background ==
Born on August 4, 1961, in Baltimore, Maryland, Verrecchio attended St. Joseph's Monastery School and Mount St. Joseph's High School in Baltimore, MD. before attending the University of Maryland from 1979 to 1981.

Born and raised in the Catholic faith in an Italian American family of seven, he fell away from the practice of Catholicism at the age of nineteen after having attended twelve years of Catholic schooling. He returned to the faith of his childhood with renewed vigor some eighteen years later and embarked on a passionate effort to learn as much as possible about Catholicism.

Largely self-taught in the field of Catholic theology, he began Scripture study at St. Francis Xavier in Hunt Valley, MD in 2001, where he served as a group study leader from 2002 to 2005. It was in this capacity that he first began to write Catholic study material.

== Harvesting the Fruit of Vatican II ==
In 2003, Verrecchio began work on the Harvesting the Fruit of Vatican II series of conciliar document study materials that explore the body of teaching of the Second Vatican Council. His work bears the Imprimatur of Archbishop Edwin Frederick O’Brien - Archbishop of Baltimore, and has been endorsed by well-known individuals such as George Pell, Cardinal Archbishop of Sydney, Australia; American theologians Fr. Peter M. J. Stravinskas, S.T.D., Ph.D.; Fr. Peter F. Ryan, S.J., S.T.D., Dr. Marcellino D'Ambrosio, Ph.D., syndicated columnist Russell Shaw, and others.

Since its publication in 2003, Harvesting the Fruit of Vatican II has been used by parish-based study groups and individuals throughout North America and in Australia, Europe and Asia.

Verrecchio was interviewed about this work by the weekly Catholic newspaper, Our Sunday Visitor in 2005.

== Columnist / Catholic News Agency ==
Verrecchio began work as a regular columnist for The Catholic Weekly, the official newspaper for the Archdiocese of Sydney, Australia. The weekly columns, which highlighted some of the more misunderstood and timely elements of the council's teachings and ran under the "Harvesting the Fruit of Vatican II" banner, made their debut in the June 1, 2008, edition.

“Mr. Verrecchio is providing readers of The Catholic Weekly with keen insights into the teachings of the Second Vatican Council,” said The Catholic Weekly's editor Kerry Myers in 2008. "The 'Harvesting the Fruit of Vatican II' columns state Catholic beliefs clearly and informatively. They are a welcome addition to our publication."

Beginning in April 2009, the "Harvesting the Fruit of Vatican II" column was a weekly offering of the Catholic News Agency where it was made available to electronic and print media outlets worldwide.

== Preparing the Way for the Roman Missal ==
In February 2011, Verrecchio and Salve Regina Publications launched the website MissalPrep.com to assist pastors and educators in preparing parishioners for the new English translation of the Roman Missal which was implemented in the United States in late 2011.

Trademarked, “Where the New Translation Meets the New Evangelization,” MissalPrep.com offered catechesis on the sacred liturgy and the forthcoming changes to the people's prayers and responses at Holy Mass in a series of tutorials. The content of the teaching was taken largely from the book And With Your Spirit: Recovering a Sense of the Sacred in the Roman Missal. The MissalPrep.com website is no longer active.

== Other Catholic Media ==
In addition to his appearance on EWTN referenced above , Verrecchio has appeared as a guest on the subject of Vatican II on the Drew Mariani Show , broadcast by the Relevant Radio network. He has also appeared with syndicated radio personality Al Kresta of the Ave Maria Radio network. He was the first guest on Up Close where he discussed the talks between Rome and the SSPX.

== Militia of the Immaculata ==
In June 2000, Verrecchio made a formal act of consecration to the Blessed Virgin Mary as a member of the Militia of the Immaculata; the worldwide evangelization movement founded by St. Maximilian Kolbe - thus the initials M.I. following his name. According to Verrecchio, he uses the initials signifying his consecration to the Virgin Mary in order to give honor to Mary, and to encourage others to investigate Marian consecration as well.

== Other projects ==
Verrecchio collaborated with Catholic theologian Steven Ray on a study of the Book of Genesis for Catholic Scripture Study International (CSS) - publisher of Catholic Scripture study material that is distributed to parishes worldwide. It was released in Fall 2008. He also created a series of Vatican II study lessons for CSS which were also released in Fall 2008.

== Transition to Traditionalism ==
Since 2013, Verrecchio has repudiated his own prior defense of the documents of the Second Vatican Council, asserting they are "polluted with ambiguities, contradictions and outright errors" that cannot be reconciled with the teachings of the pre-Conciliar Church. In numerous blog posts on his website, now renamed AKACatholic.com, Verrecchio maintains that the Novus Ordo Mass promulgated by Pope Paul VI is marred with deficiencies that obscure the traditional Catholic teaching that the Mass is a re-presentation of the sacrifice of Christ at Calvary, to the point that it should be abrogated in favor of the traditional Latin Mass. He has been highly critical of the pontificate of Pope Francis, particularly in the wake of the March 2016 promulgation of the apostolic exhortation Amoris laetitia which, according to Verrecchio, undermines traditional Catholic teaching on the indissolubility of marriage.

Since late 2016, Verrecchio has publicly held the position that Pope Francis has "judged himself a formal heretic" and, as a consequence, has surrendered the Petrine office and become an antipope by failing to respond to the dubia (questions) presented by several cardinals requesting clarification of potential heresies they believe exist in Amoris laetitia.
