= Mary Anne Sadlier =

Irish-Canadian author (1820–1903)

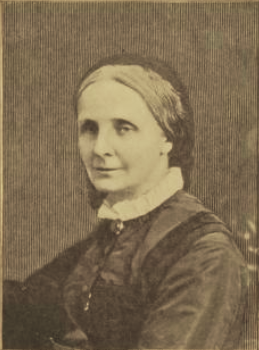
- Born: December 31, 1820; Cootehill, County Cavan, Ireland
- Died: April 5, 1903 (aged 82); Montreal, Canada
- Occupations: Novelist, short story writer
- Spouse: James Sadlier
- Children: Anna T. Sadlier
- Relatives: Francis Madden (father)
- Writing career
- Genres: Catholic novels and short stories
- Notable works: The Blakes and the Flanagans (1855)
- Notable awards: Laetare Medal (1895)

Mary Anne Sadlier (31 December 1820 – 5 April 1903) was an Irish-Canadian author. Sadlier published roughly twenty-three novels and numerous stories. She wrote for Irish immigrants in both the United States and Canada, encouraging them to attend mass and retain the Catholic faith. In so doing, Sadlier also addressed the related themes of anti-Catholicism, the Irish Famine, emigration, and domestic work.

Her writings and translations are commonly published under the name "Mrs. J. Sadlier." Earlier in her career, between 1840 and 1845, she also published some works under the pseudonym "Anne Flinders."

== Life ==
Mary Anne Sadlier (née Madden) was born on December 31, 1820, in Cootehill, County Cavan, Ireland. Her father, Francis Madden, was a successful merchant who raised Mary Anne following the death of her mother when Mary Anne was quite young.

Sadlier showed early literary promise, publishing her first poems in the London periodical "La Belle Assemblée" at the age of 18. Her father encouraged her literary aspirations, and these early works were printed while she was still a young woman in Ireland.

Francis faced a series of financial difficulties and died in 1844 when Sadlier was 23 years old. Several biographers have suggested that these financial setbacks and business struggles may have hastened his death.

== Writing career ==
Following her father's death, 24-year-old Mary Anne Sadlier emigrated to North America in 1844, initially settling in Montreal, Canada. Faced with financial difficulties and without family support, she supported herself for the next two years, primarily by writing for The Literary Garland, a prominent Canadian journal. Scholar Colleen MacDannell speculates that Sadlier may have also taken on work as a domestic servant during this time.

Publication records show that she contributed poems, short articles, and sketches to The Garland on a regular basis, eventually producing longer serialized works by early 1847. These early efforts marked the beginning of her most significant literary achievements after her move to North America.

=== Marriage and career success ===
After settling in Canada, Mary Anne met James Sadlier, the junior partner and Montreal branch manager of the New York-based Catholic publishing house D. & J. Sadlier & Company. The couple married in 1846, and their partnership had a significant influence on both of their literary careers. Mary Anne contributed to and edited her husband's magazine and several books, while James took on the role of publisher, promoter, and advisor for much of her work. His insights into the reading preferences of the Irish Catholic market frequently guided her writing and publication strategies.

While living in Canada, Sadlier published eighteen books—five novels, one collection of short stories, a religious catechism, and nine translations from the French—in addition to assorted magazine articles she contributed to the Pilot and American Celt free of charge. During her literary career, Sadlier published twenty-three novels, translated seventeen books from the French, wrote short stories and several plays.

Sadlier apparently donated her articles out of sympathy with the nationalistic causes of Irish journals. During her stay in Montreal Sadlier also wrote two novels set in Ireland: Alice Riordan; the Blind Man's Daughter (1851) and New Lights; or, Life in Galway (1853). In New Lights, Sadlier deals with the Irish Famine for the first time. The book proved one of her most popular, going through at least eight editions in fifty years. In this novel, Sadlier focuses a polemical attack on the Protestant practice of converting Irish peasants by promising them soup, but condemns peasant retaliation and violence. Sadlier published much of her work in the family's Catholic magazine, The Tablet.

In the early 1860s, the couple moved to New York City. The Sadliers' New York home became a hub of literary activity in the Catholic community, and she also enjoyed the company of Irish writers in the United States and Canada, including New York Archbishop John Hughes, editor Orestes Brownson and Thomas D'Arcy McGee. She held weekly salons in her Manhattan home, as well as her summer home on Far Rockaway on Long Island (James, 219). Sadlier's close friend was D'Arcy McGee, a poet, Irish nationalist exile, and Canadian statesman known as one of the founding "Fathers of Confederation" who helped bring about Canada's independence.

McGee and Sadlier shared an interest in a "national poetry" that would not only capture the spirit of a people, but inspire them to political and national independence. While McGee, as a man, could take part in political rallies and organize Irish-American support for Home Rule, Sadlier, as a woman, directed her support for Irish independence into literature. McGee's biographer notes that Sadlier's success inspired him to write emigrant novels, and that he was planning a novel on this subject at the time of his death (Phelan, 285). McGee's controversial politics cost him his life in 1868, when an Irish-American radical assassinated him, and his death was "a crushing blow to Mrs. Sadlier and her husband, who were his enthusiastic friends" (Anna Sadlier, 332). Sadlier edited a collection of McGee's poetry in 1869 in tribute to his memory. In later years, she lost the copyright to all her earlier works, many of which remained in print.

In 1902, she received a special blessing from Pope Leo XIII for her "illustrious service to the Catholic Church". Sadlier remained in New York for nine years before returning to Canada, where she died in 1903. One of Mary Anne's daughters, Anna Theresa Sadlier, also became a writer.

== Selected works ==
- Confessions of an apostate (1842), London: R.B. Seeley and W. Burnside (1868); New York, Boston: D. & J. Sadlier & Co.
- The "field of honour"; or, "scenes in the nineteenth century"(1844), Cockspur Street, London: W.H. Dalton.
- Naboth the Jezreelite; and other poems (1844), Bath
- The Red Hand of Ulster; or, The Fortunes of Hugh O'Neill (1850)
- Willy Burke; or, The Irish Orphan in America (1850)
- The Blakes and Flanagans, A Tale Illustrative of Irish Life in the United States (1855)
- The Confederate Chieftains: a Tale of the Irish Rebellion of 1641 (1860)
- The Babbler; a drama for boys, in one act (1861)
- Bessy Conway; or, The Irish Girl in America (1861)
- Elinor Preston: or, Scenes at Home and Abroad (1861)
- The Pope's Niece, and Other Tales (1862)
- Old and New; or, Taste versus Fashion (1862)
- Confessions of an Apostate; or, Leaves from a Troubled Life (1864))
- Con O'Regan; or, Emigrant Life in the New World (1864)
- Aunt Honor's Keepsake (1866)
- The Secret (a drama) (1873)
- The Daughter of Tyrconnell: A Tale of the Reign of James the First (1863)
- The Young Lady's Reader (1882)
- The Old House By The Boyne (1865)
- Alissa Flecq (1894)
- New Stories (1900)

== Sources ==
- Madden, Mary Anne, pp. 153–153, in Dictionary of Nineteenth-Century Irish Women Poets, Ann Elry Colman, Kenny's Bookshop, Galway, 1996. ISBN 0-906312-44-2.
- Catholic Novelists in Defense of Their Faith, 1829-1865, Willard Thorp, Arno Press, pp. 98–110
- Lot's Wife in the Novels of Mary Anne Sadlier, Janelle Peters, Postscripts, 5.2 (2009), pp. 185–204.
