= Robert Hutchinson (author) =

American writer and essayist (born 1957)

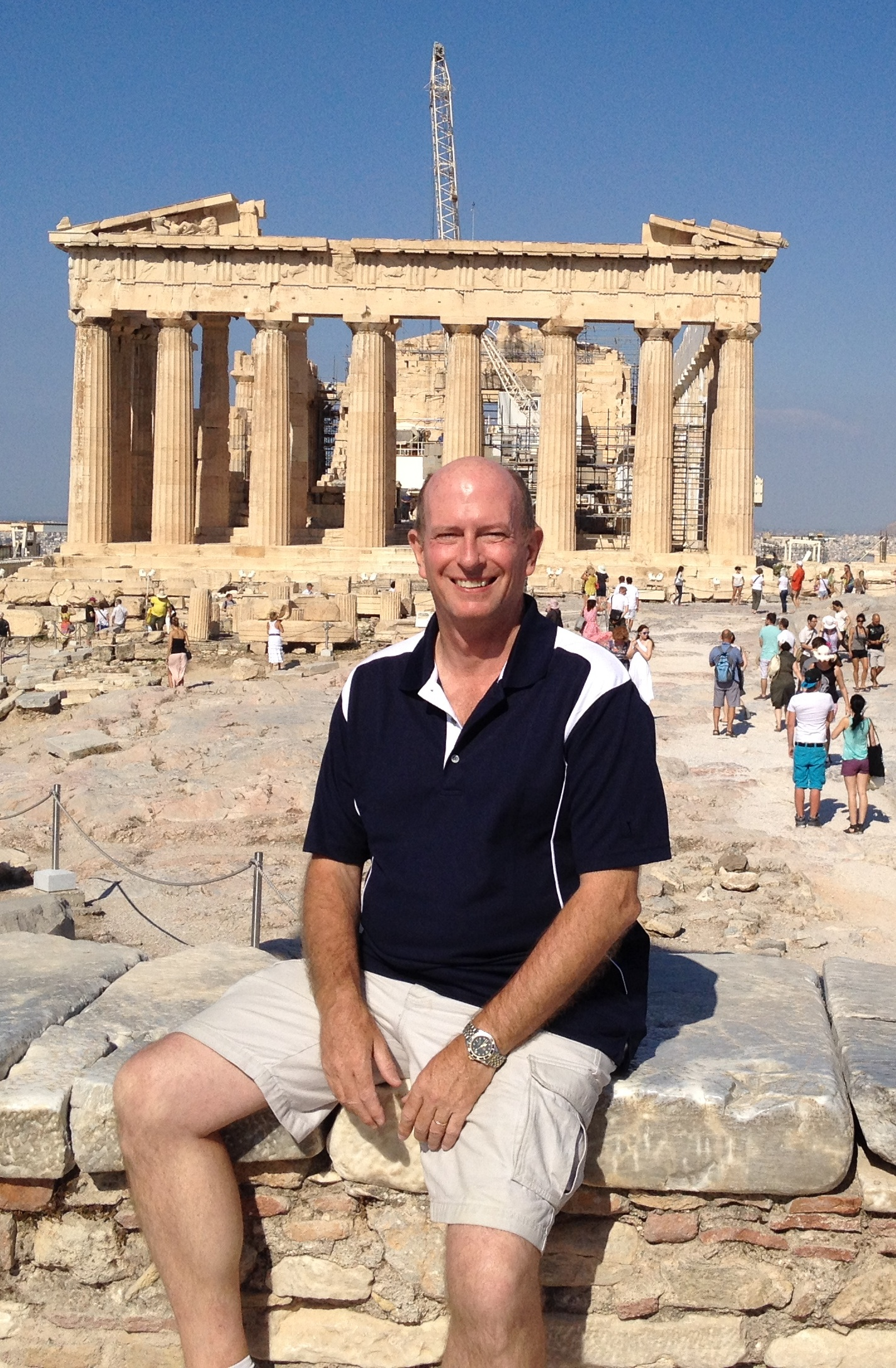
- Hutchinson at Athens, 2014
- Born: November 12, 1957 (age 68); Tacoma, Washington, U.S.
- Education: MA, theology, BA, philosophy
- Alma mater: Seattle University
- Occupations: Writer, author
- Spouse: Glenn Ellen (m. 1990)
- Children: 5
- Writing career
- Language: English, French, Hebrew
- Years active: 1995–present
- Genres: History, Travel, Religion
- Notable works: The Dawn of Christianity, Searching for Jesus: New Discoveries in the Quest for Jesus of Nazareth, When in Rome: A Journal of Life in Vatican City
- Notable awards: Society of Professional Journalists, Associated Church Press, Catholic Press Association
- Website: roberthutchinson.com

Robert J. Hutchinson (born November 12, 1957) is an American writer essayist and author. He has been a contributor to Catholic and evangelical publications, including the National Catholic Register, Christianity Today, and Aleteia. Hutchinson is the author of numerous books of popular history, most notably Searching for Jesus: New Discoveries in the Quest for Jesus of Nazareth (2015) and The Dawn of Christianity (2018). His book When in Rome is one of the books on Italy recommended by the Lonely Planet travel guide. Additionally, in 2020 Hutchinson debuted the What Really Happened series, the first about the assassination of Abraham Lincoln and the second about the death of Adolf Hitler (in light of claims of the dictator's survival). He writes a regular column on philosophical and religious topics, Disputed Questions.

== Biography ==
Hutchinson was born and raised in the Pacific Northwest, where he attended Catholic schools and earned a degree in philosophy at Seattle University.

In 1979, Hutchinson moved to Israel where he completed a series of uplanim––intensive six-month language courses for new Israeli immigrants –– and developed a lifelong interest in the Jewish roots of Christianity.

In addition to his time in Israel, Hutchinson has also lived in Rome, Italy, and in Hawaii, where he worked as the managing editor of Hawaii Magazine.

In 2004, Hutchinson earned a Master of Arts degree in theology from Fuller Theological Seminary in Pasadena, California.

He has contributed essays and syndicated columns to such outlets as Fox News, Townhall,Blaze Media, Newsmax, and Mercatornet.

== Views ==
In a series of books, Hutchinson challenges longstanding academic views on Jesus of Nazareth and early Christianity that have held sway for over a century, sparking debate.

Hutchinson claims recent archaeological discoveries and New Testament scholarship now undermine older notions that Jesus believed the world would end in his lifetime or that he was sympathetic to violent revolutionaries. Leading secular scholars at elite universities are increasingly dismissing these century-old ideas, he argues.

He also argues that the Bible's philosophical concepts formed the bedrock of Western civilization and helped pave the way for experimental science, the abolition of slavery, the development of limited government and the recognition of universal human rights.

== Appearances ==
In addition to in-person lectures, Hutchinson has appeared on a number of TV shows, including "Fox News" "Spirited Debate" with Lauren Green and the Christian Broadcasting Network. Hutchinson has been a guest on nationally syndicated radio talk shows and podcasts, including Handel in the Morning, Point of View with Kirby Anderson and The Bottom Line with Roger Marsh.

== Bibliography ==
Year	Title	Publisher	ISBN
1995	The Absolute Beginner's Guide to Gambling	Simon & Schuster	ISBN 0671529323
1996	The Book of Vices: A Collection of Classic Immoral Tales	Putnam	ISBN 157322006X
1998	When in Rome: A Journal of Life in Vatican City	Doubleday	ISBN 0385486472
2004	Czech translation of When in Rome: Tajnosti Vatikánu – Průvodce zákulisím	Faun	ISBN 8086275183
2007	The Politically Incorrect Guide to the Bible	Regnery	ISBN 1596985208
2015	Searching for Jesus: New Discoveries in the Quest for Jesus of Nazareth	Thomas Nelson	ISBN 0718018303
2017	The Dawn of Christianity: How God Used Simple Fishermen, Soldiers, and Prostitutes to Transform the World	Thomas Nelson	ISBN 0718079426
2017	French translation of Searching for Jesus: Enquête sur le Jésus historique	Salvator	ISBN 2706714824
2018	French translation of The Dawn of Christianity: Enquête sur le début du Christianisme	Salvator	ISBN 2706716371
2020	The Lincoln Assassination: What Really Happened	Regnery History	ISBN 1621578860
2020	The Death of Hitler: What Really Happened	Regnery History	ISBN 1621578887
