= Juan de Albi =

Spanish Carthusian

Juan de Albi was a Spanish Carthusian of the Convent Val-Christ, near Segovia, date of birth uncertain; died 27 December 1591. He was familiar with the Semitic languages, especially Hebrew, and had the reputation of being a skilled commentator. His work is: Sacrarum semioseon, animadversionum et electorum ex utriusque Testamenti lectione commentarius et centuria (Valencia, 1610); it was re-edited in Venice, 1613, under the title Selectæ Annotationes in varia utriusque Testamenti loca difficiliora.
