= Jan Lipšanský =

Czech publicist, scriptwriter and writer

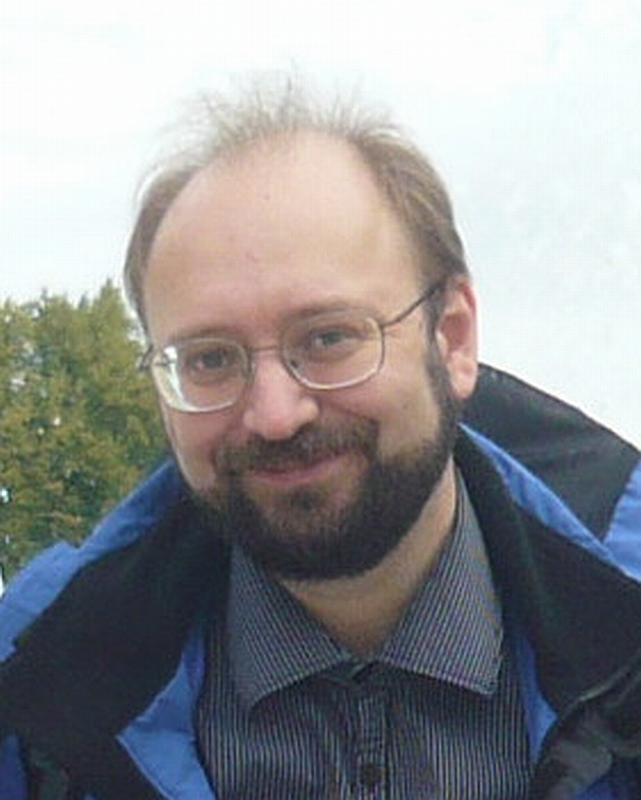

Jan Lipšanský (born 27 September 1968, in Brno) is a Czech journalist, screenplay writer, writer and stage director.

He studied at Film and TV School of the Academy of Performing Arts in Prague, screenplaywriting and dramaturgy. He is active in advertising (Mark/BBDO, JWT, Mother Tongue etc.), as journalist he was in various known Czech newspapers and magazines (Večerník Praha, Kino, PC World, DiViDi, Katolický týdeník, Tiscali, Filmpub, Christnet and others). He worked as a public relations editor in Czech Television (1995–1997).

He wrote some screenplays for Czech Television and for some amateur movie makers. He is also active in radio broadcasting Czech Radio, Radio Vaticana. He was the president of Ecumenical Jury at Karlovy Vary International Film Festival 2002.

His stories you can find in Mysli si svět (Kruh Hradec Králové, 1990), Jak Češi jednají (Milenium Publishing Chomutov 2000), Fantasy 1992 /2002 (Avari/Klub Julese Vernea 2003), České srdce pro Jana Pavla II. (Karmelitánské nakladatelství 2005), Brněnská diecéze (1777–2007), Historie a vzpomínky (Brněnské biskupství 2006), sborník literární soutěže Řehečská slepice 2007.

His first novel, The Death of Fallen Brother (Smrt odpadlého bratra) was published by Fatym, 2005, and reprinted by Akcent, Třebíč in 2009. He also wrote historic drama about Czech king Wenceslas II. Deník Václava II.

In 2011, he directed stage play Smíšené dvouhry (Mixed Doubles)

He is also author of comics ZOO Stories (Příběhy ze ZOO) for famous Czech magazine Čtyřlístek.

Some of his Prague stories (with various other authors) you can find in the book Prague Mysteries, published in 2015.

== Bibliography ==
- 2005: SMRT ODPADLÉHO BRATRA, ISBN 978-80-239-9692-0
- 2008: NA OBRANU KATOLÍKŮ, ISBN 978-80-254-2132-1
- 2008: MRTVÍ MOHOU TANCOVAT, ISBN 978-80-254-2331-8
- 2009: TŘI MINIPŘÍPADY JACKA LINNÉHO, ISBN 978-80-87313-00-8
- 2009: DENÍK VÁCLAVA II., ISBN 978-80-7268-560-8
- 2009: SMRT ODPADLÉHO BRATRA / JEDINÝ DEN TÉ ZIMY PADAL SNÍH, ISBN 978-80-7268-544-8
- 2009: ČESKÝ FILM 1990 – 2007, ISBN 978-80-254-2669-2
- 2010: DITA MĚLA SVÁTEK / NAPOLEON ZE ŠLAPANIC, ISBN 978-80-7453-038-8
- 2011: MRTVÁ Z LETIŠTĚ, ISBN 978-80-7453-165-1
- 2012: KDO ZABIL ELVISE PRESLEYHO?, ISBN 978-80-7453-200-9
- 2013: BRIANOVA CESTA, ISBN 978-80-87848-06-6 (see: http://www.bezvydavatele.cz/book.php?Id=342)
- 2014: PRAŽSKÁ NOKTURNA, ISBN 978-80-87978-14-6
- 2014: OFICIÁLNÍ TISKOVÁ ZPRÁVA Z ORBITÁLNÍ STANICE, ISBN 978-80-7504-123-4
- 2015: PRAŽSKÁ NOKTURNA, ISBN 978-1514179956
- 2015: BRIANOVA CESTA, ISBN 978-1514394793
- 2015: OFICIÁLNÍ TISKOVÁ ZPRÁVA Z ORBITÁLNÍ STANICE, ISBN 978-80-7453-648-9
