= Willem Jan Otten =

Dutch prose writer, playwright and poet (born 1951)

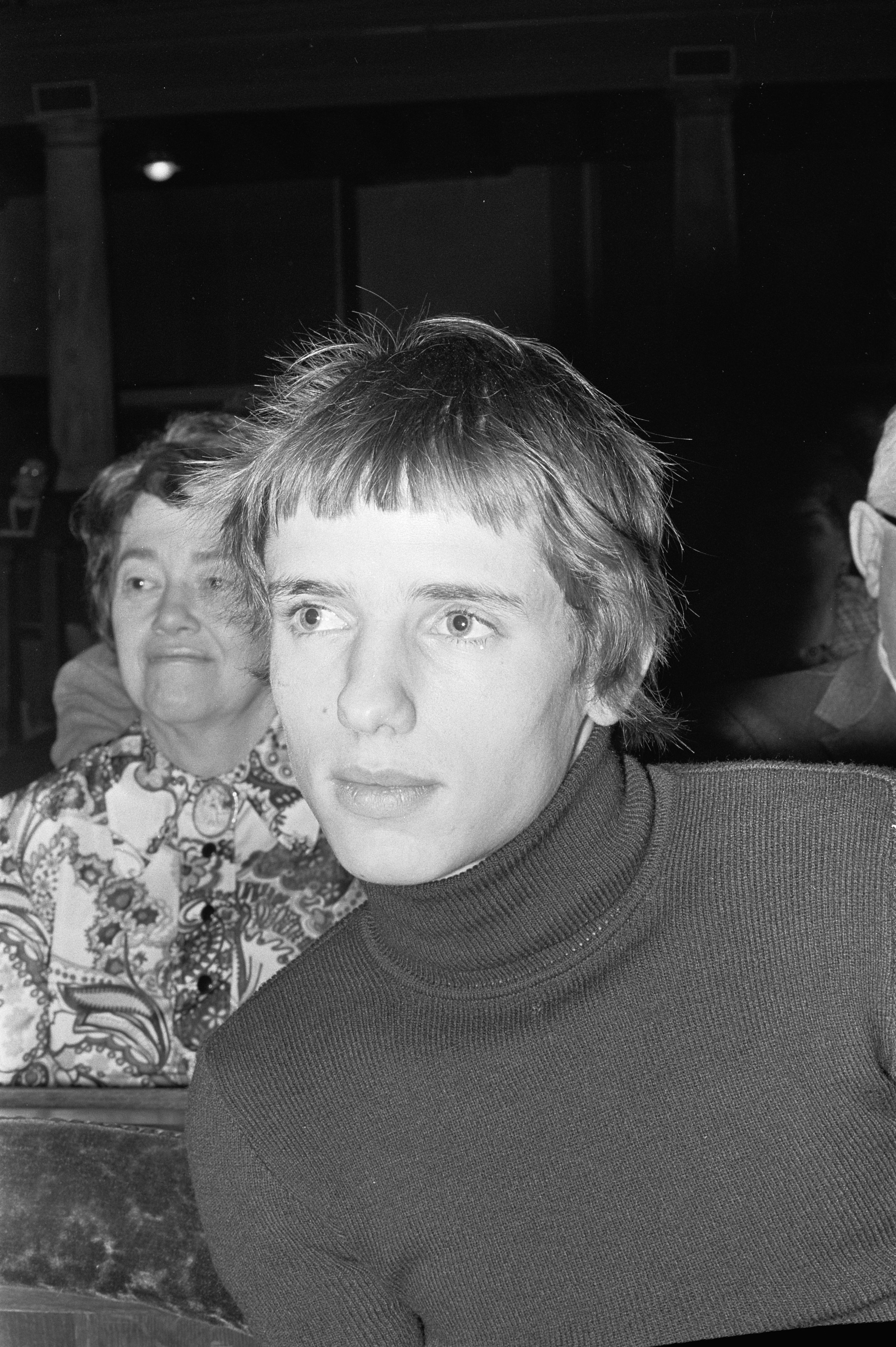
Willem Jan Otten (1972)

Willem Jan Otten (October 4, 1951-) is a Dutch prose writer, playwright and poet, who in 2014 won the P. C. Hooft Award for lifetime literary achievement.

== Biography ==
Otten was born in Amsterdam as the son of the musicians Marijke Ferguson and Kees Otten. He spent his youth in the Rivierenbuurt in Amsterdam and in Laren.

He grew up in an atmosphere of moral libertinism. His nonfiction is in part a reflection upon that atmosphere and a polemic with the philosophy behind that atmosphere. He published his first book of poetry in 1973. He has published essays and fiction about euthanasia and played a role in the euthanasia debate in the Netherlands by criticizing the arguments in favour of euthanasia and the freedom of choice in matters of one's own life and death.

In 1999 he published an essay Het wonder van de losse olifanten, een rede tot de ontwikkelden onder de verachters van de christelijke religie ("The miracle of the solitary elephants. Lecture addressed to the cultivated among the despisers of the Christian religion") in which he examined the arguments pro and contra Christian belief. This lecture followed upon his conversion to Roman Catholicism.

Some of his books are translated in Italian, German, French and Swedish. He won the 2005 Libris Prize for Specht en zoon. Otten is married to writer Vonne van der Meer.

== Awards ==
- 1972 - Reina Prinsen Geerligsprijs - Een zwaluw vol zaagsel
- 1981 - Herman Gorterprijs -Ik zoek het hier
- 1992 - Jan Campertprijs - Paviljoenen
- 1994 - Busken Huetprijs - De letterpiloot
- 1999 - Constantijn Huygens Prize - collected works
- 2005 - Libris Literatuur Prijs - Specht en zoon
- 2007 - Honorary degree in theology from Utrecht University.
- 2014 - P. C. Hooft Award

== Bibliography ==
- Een zwaluw vol zaagsel, 1973 (poetry)
- Het keurslijf, 1974 (poetry)
- De eend. Een epyllion, 1975 (poetry)
- Het ruim, 1976 (poetry)
- Henry II, 1978 (toneelstuk)
- Ik zoek het hier, 1980 (poetry)
- Een sneeuw, 1983 (play)
- Een man van horen zeggen, 1984 (novel)
- Denken is een lust, 1985 (essay)
- Lichaam & blik, 1986 (play)
- Na de nachttrein, 1988 (poetry)
- Boek en film, 1989 (essay)
- Het museum van licht, 1991 (essays about film)
- Paviljoenen, 1991 - ISBN 90-282-0785-6 (poetry)
- De wijde blik, 1992 (novel)
- De letterpiloot, 1994 - ISBN 90-282-0786-4 (essays)
- Ons mankeert niets, 1994 - ISBN 90-282-0866-6 (novel)
- De fuik van Pascal, 1997 (essay)
- De nacht van de pauw, 1997 (play)
- Eindaugustuswind, 1998 (poetry)
- Het wonder van de losse olifanten, 1999 (essay)
- Oude mensen, 1999 (play)
- Eerdere gedichten, 2000 (poetry)
- Op de hoge, 2003 (poetry)
- Braambos, 2004 (play)
- Specht en zoon, 2004 (novel)
- Een sneeuw en meer toneel, 2006 (play)
- Alexander, 2006 (play)
- Waarom komt u ons hinderen, 2006 (essays)
- Welkom, 2008 (poetry)
- De bedoeling van verbeelding. Zomerdagboek, gevolgd door zes gedichten, 2008 (diary, poetry)
- Onze Lieve Vrouwe van de Schemering. Essays over poëzie, film en geloof, 2009 (essays)
- De genadeklap, 2017 (poetry)
