= Li Yingshi =

Ming Chinese military officer and astrologer

Li Yingshi (traditional Chinese: 李應試; simplified Chinese: 李应试, referred to by Jesuits as Li Paul; fl. ca. 1600) was a Ming Chinese military officer, scientist, astrologer and feng shui practicer that was converted to Christianity. He was converted to Catholicism by Matteo Ricci and Diego de Pantoja, the first two Jesuits to establish themselves in Beijing. He then became a zealous Christian.

== Early life ==
Li Yingshi was a member of the Chinese literati class. He commanded a unit of 500 soldiers during the Korean War of 1592–98. He was awarded a lifetime pension by the Wanli government, which was to continue to be paid to his heirs in perpetuity.

During peacetime, he studied astrology and geomancy.

== Conversion ==
In the meantime, in 1601 the Jesuits Matteo Ricci and Diego de Pantoja became the first Christian missionaries to be settled in the Ming capital. They appreciated Confucian learning and wanted to establish good relations with the Chinese literati, but strongly disparaged the "ridiculous wizardry" of Chinese occult practices. This is why, perhaps, Ricci described the Jesuits' conversion of Li Yingshi to Christianity – which was accomplished on the Feast of St Matthew (i.e., September 21) of 1602 – as nothing less than "extraordinary".

Once Li became a Christian, it took him, Ricci, and de Pantoja three days to go through his "beautiful and well stocked library" to identify all books and manuscripts "forbidden by ecclesiastical regulations". The forbidden books and manuscripts, mostly dealing with the "art of divination" were then burned, some at Li's own courtyard and others at the Beijing Mission House, to demonstrate Li's commitment to Christianity. This apparently was not an uncommon practice in Ricci's day: when another celebrated convert, the mathematician Ignatius Qu Taisu (瞿太素; Chiutaiso in Ricci's transcription) became Christian, he also sent his library of books on "the dogma of the sects" to the Nanjing Mission House to be burned, along with book printing plates and non-Christian religious statues.

Li Yingshi became a zealous member of the Catholic church. He proselytized among his friends and relatives, and got all his servants to join the church as well. He had a chapel built at his home and had his son study at the Beijing Mission House, so that soon enough the young Li was able to celebrate Mass himself.

As a person highly knowledgeable about the "sect of idol worshippers", Li was able to supply the Jesuits with a large amount of information that they found helpful in converting other non-Christians.

== See also ==
- Three Pillars of Chinese Catholicism
