= Francis Ripley =

English Roman Catholic priest

Canon Francis Joseph Ripley (26 August 1912 – 7 January 1998) was a Roman Catholic priest from St Helens, Lancashire, England. He wrote several books during his lifetime, including This is The Faith. Later in life he held the position of canon.

This is The Faith was originally published in 1951 in Great Britain. It is based upon talks the author gave to people inquiring into the Catholic faith. Essentially, it discusses all of the basics of the Catholic faith. It is addressed in such a way as to appeal to non-Catholics.

TAN Books revised it and reprinted it in 2002 in a paperback edition. This edition is criticized by some as it has been edited to conform to certain changes of Vatican II. The Bible quotes in the 2002 edition use much more archaic language than the quotes of the 1952 American edition.

== Sources and bibliography ==
Books

- Ripley, Francis J. This is The Faith. The Newman Press, Westminster, Maryland. 1952.
- Ripley, Francis J. This is The Faith (3rd Edition). TAN Books and Publishers, Rockford, Illinois. 2002.

Pamphlets

- Letter to a lapsed Catholic (1959)
- The Church Christ Founded (1959)
- God (1962)
- Immortality (1962)
- The Blessed Trinity and the life of the soul (1962)
- Creation (1963)
- La Legión de María y la Vida Sacerdotal (1962)
