= Roman Triptych =

"Roman Triptych: Meditations" is a forty-page poem by Pope John Paul II, composed of three parts: Stream, Meditation on the Book of Genesis, and A Hill in the Moria Land. Originally written in John Paul II's native Polish after a visit to his homeland of Poland, the poem was translated to Italian by Grażyna Miller, and published in 2003 simultaneously in Poland (as Tryptyk Rzymski: Medytacje) and the Vatican (as Trittico romano, Meditazioni).

The poem has since been translated into languages including English (by Jerzy Pietrkiewicz), French, Spanish, and German. A Polish audio version was recorded by actor Krzysztof Globisz.

Roman Triptych received praise from philosopher and historian Stanisław Grygiel, poet and Nobel laureate Czesław Miłosz, poet Marek Skwarnicki, and Cardinal Joseph Ratzinger, several of whom were close personal friends of John Paul II. It was especially popular in Poland, selling out 80% of the initial print run of 300,000 copies before the official launch date.
