= Aloysius Schlör =

Austrian Catholic ascetic writer

Aloysius Schlör (1805-1852) was an Austrian Catholic ascetic writer.

== See also ==
- Catholic Church in Austria
