= María Nestora Téllez =

Mexican writer (1828–1890)

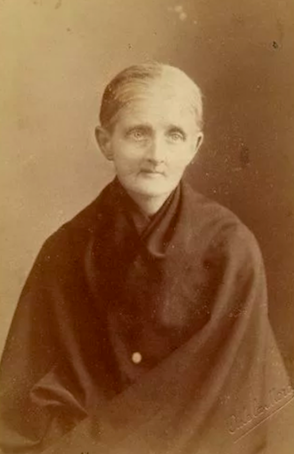
- Téllez-Rendón c. 1866
- Born: María Josefa Francisca de Paula Téllez-Rendón; 25 February 1828; San Juan del Rio, Queretaro, Mexico
- Died: 9 December 1890 (aged 62); Acambaro, Guanajuato, Mexico
- Occupations: Author; teacher; poet
- Writing career
- Years active: 1850–1890
- Genres: Novel; fantasy; allegory; poetry; textbook
- Subject: Christianity
- Notable work: Staurofila

María Nestora Téllez (25 February 1828 – 9 December 1890) was a Mexican writer and teacher, known mainly for her allegorical novel Staurofila.

== Early years and education ==
Nestora Téllez was born in San Juan del Rio, Queretaro, on 25 February 1828, and baptized the day after, as María Josefa Francisca de Paula. Nevertheless, being then the day of Saint Nestor, she took the name of Nestora. Her parents were Antonio Tellez, who had been a member of the Queretaro Conspiracy (root of the Mexican War of Independence), and Trinidad Rendon, both teachers.

When she was one year old, she suffered an eye disease that left her blind. She lived then in Toliman, Queretaro. In spite of her condition, for her great intellectual capacity, she received a careful personalized education in grammar, arithmetic and religion by her father. When she was nine years old, while the family resided in Zamora, Michoacan, her father died. For this reason, they returned to Querétaro. There, she continued her education under the protection of her brother-in-law, Dr. Manuel Altamirano, who was a medical doctor, a botanist and a Latin teacher. With him, she learned Latin and perfected her knowledge on grammar and arithmetic. She continued studies on logic with one son of Dr. Altamirano.

== Career ==
Later, she helped her mother in a school that depended on the Franciscans, and prepared future teachers in grammar and arithmetic. At the same time, she continued her interest in religion and literature, and began to compose poetry and short stories. Her mother died in 1856, so she continued in charge of the school with her sister, Dolores Tellez de Noriega. Later, she opened another private school.

As she was teaching without having the title of professor, she submitted a test to obtain this document in 1866. She obtained the title and was also conferred the Cross of the Order of Saint Charles during the Second Mexican Empire. In 1873, she underwent an eyes surgical operation, carried out by Dr. Carmona and Valle. After the operation, she recovered the sight partially and temporarily, but soon she returned to blindness.

In 1889, she consented to the publication of her novel Staurofila, which she called an allegorical tale, provided that her name was not mentioned.

Nestora died in Acambaro, Guanajuato, on December 9, 1890. Three years later, Staurofila, her only novel, was published again with the mention of the author's name.
