= Eifelheim =

2006 science fiction novel by Michael Flynn

- Cover of the 2006 Tor Books edition
- Author: Michael Flynn
- Language: English
- Genre: Science fiction
- Published in: Analog Science Fiction and Fact
- Publisher: Davis Publications
- Publication date: November 1986
- Publication place: United States
- Media type: Print (Periodical)

Eifelheim
- Author: Michael Flynn
- Language: English
- Genre: Science fiction
- Publisher: Tor Books
- Publication date: October 17, 2006
- Publication place: United States
- Media type: Print (Hardcover & paperback)
- Pages: 320 (hardcover)
- ISBN: 978-0-7653-0096-6
- OCLC: 64289026
- Dewey Decimal: 813/.54 22
- LC Class: PS3556.L89 E35 2006

Eifelheim is a science fiction novel by American author Michael Flynn, published in 2006. The story first appeared as a novella in the November 1986 issue of Analog Science Fiction and Fact, which was a nominee for the Hugo Award for Best Novella in 1987. The full novel was similarly nominated for the Hugo Award for Best Novel in 2007.

== Plot summary ==
In 1349, Eifelheim, a small town in the Black Forest of Germany, vanished: it ceased to appear on any maps or in any documents, having apparently been abandoned and never resettled by its community. The disappearance is no mystery — the Black Death devastated Europe. But why was the area never resettled, unlike most other depopulated areas? The mystery intrigues cliometric historian Tom Schwoerin, who sets out to solve the puzzle with the help of his partner, theoretical physicist Sharon Nagy. They gradually uncover evidence of an alien crash-landing in the area.

The village was originally called Oberhochwald, and then afterwards renamed Teufelheim (Devil home in German), which was eventually distorted to Eifelheim. They also learn of the town's priest, Father Dietrich, an educated man who served the town in 1348, as the Black Death arrived in Northern Europe. Dietrich, it appears, acted as humanity's first ambassador and the primary liaison between Eifelheim and the aliens who happened to wreck their starship in the woods outside the village.

The novel concentrates primarily on the alien encounter in the 14th century, paying special attention to the interplay between Dietrich, a Christian scholar who is fond of Aristotle and metaphor, and the technologically advanced, post-Einsteinian band of otherworldly travelers. The interplay includes two theological questions. The first, "can aliens become Christians?" is answered in the affirmative, as some of them become converts. The second, "where is God when things go wrong?" is more difficult to answer, for both the Germans and the alien Krenken. The Germans are stricken by the Black Death, and the Krenken, who are immune to the disease, but cannot return to their home, require an amino acid not found in earthly organisms. The answer is two-fold: there is always hope, and God's love is expressed to us in the unselfish love of fellow creatures. Dietrich's attempts to understand the science of the Krenken (their view of the Solar System, and gravity, is quite different from his) and their attempts to explain it to him, are also an important theme.

William of Ockham appears as a minor character. Nagy's search for a new physics, which will lead to a new means of space travel, is helped by Schwoerin's research. He discovers a Krenken circuit diagram, drawn in a manuscript by monks.

== Literary significance and reception ==
Regina Schroder in her review for Booklist wrote "Flynn credibly maintains the voice of a man whose worldview is based on concepts almost entirely foreign to the modern mind, and he makes a tense and thrilling story of historical research out of the contemporary portions of the tale." Kirkus Reviews praised the novel, calling it "Another meticulously researched, intense, mesmerizing novel (based in some part on a 1986 short story) for readers seeking thoughtful science fiction of the highest order." Entertainment Weekly said that the novel was for fans of "Brainy first-contact tales (Carl Sagan meets Umberto Eco)". According to their review, the novel was "bursting with pungent historical detail and Big Theme musings," and that "this dense, provocative novel offers big rewards to patient readers."
