= Michael Flynn (writer) =

American science fiction author (1947–2023)

- Born: Michael Francis Flynn; December 20, 1947; Easton, Pennsylvania, U.S.
- Died: September 30, 2023 (aged 75); Easton, Pennsylvania, U.S.
- Education: La Salle University (BA); Marquette University (MS)
- Occupations: Statistician, science fiction author
- Known for: Science fiction author

Michael Francis Flynn (December 20, 1947 – September 30, 2023) was an American science fiction author. Nearly all of Flynn's work falls under the category of hard science fiction, although his treatment of it can be unusual since he applied the rigor of hard science fiction to "softer" sciences such as sociology in works such as In the Country of the Blind. Much of his short fiction appeared in Analog Science Fiction and Fact.

== Early life and education ==
Flynn was born on December 20, 1947, in Easton, Pennsylvania, to Joseph and Rita (Singley) Flynn. He had a brother, Dennis, who died in childhood. Flynn attended and graduated from Notre Dame High School, then located in Bethlehem Township.

He earned a B.A. in mathematics from La Salle University in Easton, and an M.S. in topology from Marquette University in Milwaukee. He began but did not complete a Ph.D at the University of Colorado Boulder.

== Career ==
Prior to becoming a science fiction author, he was employed as an industrial quality engineer and statistician with Coors Container Corporation and Stat-A-Matrix/Oriel.

== Awards ==
Hugo Award nominations

- 1987 novella Eifelheim
- 1988 novella The Forest of Time
- 1995 novella Melodies of the Heart
- 2005 novelette The Clapping Hands of God
- 2007 novelette "Dawn, and Sunset, and the Colours of the Earth"
- 2007 novel Eifelheim (based on the 1987 novella)
- 2015 novelette "The Journeyman: In the Stone House"

Prometheus Award

- 1991 In the Country of the Blind (won)
- 1992 Fallen Angels (won)
- 1997 Firestar (finalist)
- 1999 Rogue Star (finalist)
- 2001 Lodestar (finalist)
- 2002 Falling Stars (finalist)
- 2009 The January Dancer (finalist)
- 2013 In the Lion's Mouth (nominated)
- 2024 In the Belly of the Whale (won)

Other awards

- Fallen Angels also won the Seiun Award, and was co-written with Larry Niven and Jerry Pournelle.
- The novelette "House of Dreams" won a Theodore Sturgeon Award in 1998.
- The novelette "Quaestiones Super Caelo et Mundo" tied with Kristine Kathryn Rusch's novella "Recovering Apollo 8" for the Sidewise Award for Alternate History in 2007.
- First winner of the Robert A. Heinlein Medal.

== Death ==
Flynn died at his childhood home in Easton, Pennsylvania, on September 30, 2023, at age 75. He is interred at New St. Joseph's Cemetery in Easton. He was predeceased by his wife of 49 years, Margie.

== Sources ==
- Flynn, Michael. The January Dancer; Macmillan, (2008).
