= List of converts to Catholicism =

The following is a list of notable individuals who converted to Catholicism from a different religion or no religion.

== Converts ==
=== A ===
- Hank Aaron : American professional baseball right fielder.
- Greg Abbott : 48th Governor of Texas
- Creighton Abrams : U.S. Army General, converted while commanding US forces in Vietnam
- Vladimir Abrikosov: Russian who became an Eastern-rite priest.
- Anna Abrikosova: Russian convert to Eastern-rite Catholicism who was imprisoned by the Soviets
- John Adams : English beatified person and Catholic martyr
- Mortimer J. Adler : American philosopher, educator, and popular author; converted from agnosticism, after decades of interest in Thomism
- Leo Africanus : Berber Andalusi Moorish diplomat and author who was converted to Christianity following his capture.
- Afonso I of Kongo : African king; although politically motivated he became quite pious
- Sohrab Ahmari : Iranian-American columnist, editor, and author of nonfiction books.
- Leo Allatius : Greek theologian
- Fanny Allen : daughter of Ethan Allen; became a nun
- Thomas William Allies : English writer
- Svetlana Alliluyeva : daughter of Joseph Stalin
- Mother Mary Alphonsa : daughter of Nathaniel Hawthorne, born "Rose Hawthorne"; became a nun and founder of St. Rose's Free Home for Incurable Cancer
- Veit Amerbach : Lutheran theologian and humanist before conversion
- William Henry Anderdon: English Jesuit and writer
- Władysław Anders : General in the Polish Army; later a politician with the Polish government-in-exile in London
- G. E. M. Anscombe : British analytical philosopher and theologian who introduced the term "consequentialism" into the English language. Wife of Peter Geach
- Princess Irene, Duchess of Aosta : Greek Princess who converted from Greek Orthodoxy in 1939.
- Francis Arinze: Nigerian Cardinal and Prefect of the Congregation for Divine Worship and the Discipline of the Sacraments
- Gavin Ashenden : English writer, broadcaster and theologian. Former Chaplain to the Queen and Episcopalian bishop. Converted in December 2019.
- Mary Astor : American actress who converted in 1941.
- Thomas Aufield : English priest and martyr
- Augustine of Hippo : theologian, philosopher, and the bishop of Hippo Regius in Numidia, Roman North Africa. His writings influenced the development of Western philosophy and Western Christianity, and he is viewed as one of the most important Church Fathers of the Latin Church in the Patristic Period. He was raised by a Catholic Mother, Monica, but joined the Manichean sect before converting and being baptized into the Catholic faith at the age of 31.
- Augustus II the Strong : German Prince who was Elector of Saxony, King of Poland and Grand Duke of Lithuania. Converted from Lutheranism in 1697.

=== B ===
- Johann Christian Bach: composer; youngest son of Johann Sebastian Bach
- Thomas Bailey: royalist and controversialist; his father was Anglican bishop Lewis Bayly
- Beryl Bainbridge: English novelist
- Bessie Anstice Baker, Australian writer and philanthropist, author of A Modern Pilgrim's Progress
- Francis Asbury Baker: American priest, missionary, and social worker; one of the founders of the Paulist Fathers in 1858
- Josephine Bakhita: Sudanese-born former slave; became a Canossian Religious Sister in Italy, living and working there for 45 years; in 2000 she was declared a saint
- Banine: French writer of Azeri descent
- Daniel Barber: An American priest of the Episcopal Church before his conversion to Catholicism
- Maurice Baring: English intellectual, writer, and war correspondent
- Mark Barkworth: English Catholic priest, martyr, and beatified person
- Barlaam of Seminara: involved in the Hesychast controversy as an opponent to Gregory Palamas, possibly a revert
- Arthur Barnes: formerly an Anglican priest, who became a Catholic writer and the first Catholic chaplain of both Cambridge and Oxford Universities
- Edwin Barnes: formerly an Anglican bishop
- Joan Bartlett: foundress of the Servite Secular Institute
- Victoria Eugenie of Battenberg: British princess who became Queen consort of Spain; converted in 1906 from Anglicanism.
- James Roosevelt Bayley: first bishop of the Catholic Archdiocese of Newark and eighth Archbishop of Baltimore
- Aubrey Beardsley: English illustrator and author; before his death, converted to Catholicism and renounced his erotic drawings
- Francis J. Beckwith: American philosopher, Baylor University professor, and former president of the Evangelical Theological Society; technically a revert
- Jean Mohamed Ben Abdeljlil: Moroccan scholar and Catholic priest
- Benedict Mar Gregorios: Metropolitan Archbishop of Trivandrum, 1955–1994
- Peter Benenson: founder of human rights group Amnesty International
- Robert Hugh Benson: English writer and theologian; son of an Archbishop of Canterbury
- Elizabeth Bentley: former Soviet spy who defected to the West; was converted by Archbishop Fulton J. Sheen
- Bernard Berenson: American art historian specializing in the Renaissance.
- Mary Kay Bergman: American voice actress
- Bernardo the Japanese: one of the first Japanese people to visit Europe
- Jiao Bingzhen: painter and astronomer
- Conrad Black: Canadian-born historian, columnist, UK peer, and convicted felon for fraud; his conviction was overturned subsequently on appeal
- Tony Blair: former prime minister of the United Kingdom; converted 22 December 2007, after stepping down as prime minister
- Cherry Boone: daughter of devoutly evangelical Christian entertainer Pat Boone; she went public about her battle with anorexia nervosa
- John Wilkes Booth: 19th-century actor; assassin of President Abraham Lincoln; his sister Asia Booth asserted in her 1874 memoir that Booth, baptized an Episcopalian at age 14, had become a Catholic; for the good of the Church during a notoriously anti-Catholic time in American history, Booth's conversion was not publicized
- Robert Bork: American jurist and unsuccessful nominee to the United States Supreme Court; converted to Catholicism in 2003; his wife was a former Catholic nun
- Louis Bouyer: French theologian; converted to Catholicism in 1939
- Jim Bowie: American pioneer, slave smuggler and trader, and soldier who played a prominent role in the Texas Revolution. Bowie was baptized in San Antonio on April 28, 1828, sponsored by the alcalde (chief administrator) of the town, Juan Martín de Veramendi, and his wife, Josefa Navarro. His conversion was to take advantage of a land grant
- John Randal Bradburne: warden of the leper colony at Mutoko, Rhodesia and a candidate for canonization
- William Maziere Brady: Irish historian and journalist, formerly a Church of Ireland priest
- Elinor Brent-Dyer: English writer
- Alexander Briant: one of the Forty Martyrs of England and Wales
- John Broadhurst: formerly an Anglican bishop; also a revert
- Heywood Broun: sportswriter, columnist, author; was converted by Archbishop Fulton J. Sheen
- George Mackay Brown: Scottish poet, author and dramatist from the Orkney Islands
- Sam Brownback: Governor of Kansas
- Orestes Brownson: American writer
- Dave Brubeck: American jazz musician
- Elizabeth Bruenig: American journalist working as an opinion writer for The Atlantic.
- David-Augustin de Brueys: French theologian and dramatist
- John Frederick, Duke of Brunswick: German Prince who was duke of Brunswick-Lüneburg, converted in 1651 from Lutheranism.
- Elisabeth Christine of Brunswick-Wolfenbüttel: German Princess who became Holy Roman Impress, converted in 1708 from Lutheranism.
- Ismaël Bullialdus: French astronomer; converted from Calvinism and became a Catholic priest
- Andrew Burnham: formerly an Anglican bishop
- Jeb Bush: American politician, forty-third Governor of Florida
- Thomas Byles: priest who died serving others on the RMS Titanic

=== C ===
- Roy Campbell: South-African-born, English-based (later Portuguese-based) poet
- Margaret Campbell, Duchess of Argyll: Scottish heiress, socialite and aristocrat. She converted from Protestantism in 1933.
- Abigail Campbell Kawānanakoa: Politician and Princess of Hawaii; she converted from Anglicanism in 1900.
- Edmund Campion: Jesuit martyr who wrote Decem Rationes, which denounced Anglicanism; one of the Forty Martyrs of England and Wales
- Alexis Carrel: French surgeon and biologist who was awarded the Nobel Prize in Physiology or Medicine in 1912
- Rianti Cartwright: Indonesian actress, model, presenter and VJ; two weeks before departure to the United States to get married, Rianti left the Muslim faith to become a baptized Catholic with the name Sophia Rianti Rhiannon Cartwright
- Hansen Clarke: American politician and former U.S. Congressman. He converted from Islam.
- Kenneth Clark: British art historian, museum director, and broadcaster. Converted shortly before his death.
- G.K. Chesterton: British writer, journalist and essayist, known for his Christian apologetics Orthodoxy, Heretics and The Everlasting Man
- Djibril Cissé: French international footballer
- Wesley Clark: U.S. Army General; former Supreme Allied Commander Europe of NATO; candidate for Democratic nomination for President in 2004
- Buffalo Bill Cody: American soldier, bison hunter, and showman. Converted the day before his death
- Stephen Colbert: American comedian, writer, actor, political commentator, and host of the Late Show with Stephen Colbert: he was raised in a religious household, later to depart to atheism in his youth. However, in his twenties, he returned, having a powerful conversion to Catholicism
- Emily Coleman: American-born writer; lifelong compulsive diary keeper
- Henry James Coleridge: son of John Taylor Coleridge; became a priest
- James Collinson: artist who briefly went back to Anglicanism in order to marry Christina Rossetti
- Constantine the African: Tunisian doctor who converted from Islam and became a Benedictine monk
- Tim Conway: American comedian; converted to Catholicism because he said he liked the way the Church is structured
- Gary Cooper: American actor who converted to the Church late in life, saying, "that decision I made was the right one"
- Frederick Copleston: English historian of philosophy and Jesuit priest
- Gerty Cori: Czech-American biochemist who became the third woman, and first American woman, to win a Nobel Prize in science, and the first woman to be awarded the Nobel Prize in Physiology or Medicine
- Richard Crashaw: English poet; son of a staunch anti-Catholic father

=== D ===
- Lorenzo Da Ponte: Italian writer and poet; converted from Judaism on his father's remarriage
- Kim Dae-jung: President of South Korea, Nobel Peace Prize recipient
- Christopher Davenport: Recollect friar whose efforts to show that the Thirty-Nine Articles could be interpreted more in accordance with Catholic teaching caused controversy among fellow Catholics
- Dominique Dawes: Olympic gold medalist
- Christopher Dawson: British independent scholar, who wrote many books on cultural history and Christendom. Dawson has been called "the greatest English-speaking Catholic historian of the twentieth century". He converted to Catholicism in 1909
- Dorothy Day: social activist and pacifist; founder of the Catholic Worker movement; was raised nominally Episcopalian
- David-Augustin de Brueys: French theologian
- Zerai Deres : Eritrean revolutionary and translator.
- Regina Derieva: Russian poet
- Alfred Döblin: German expressionist novelist, best known for Berlin Alexanderplatz
- Catherine Doherty: Canadian pioneer of social justice; converted from Russian Christianity
- Audrey Donnithorne: English political economist and missionary, daughter of Vyvyan Donnithorne, an evangelical Anglican missionary to Sichuan.
- Diana Dors: actress who was once called a "wayward hussy" by the Archbishop of Canterbury, Geoffrey Fisher; in the 1970s she converted to Catholicism and had a Catholic funeral
- Ralph Downes: organist, teacher and designer of the Royal Festival Hall organ; long-time organist of the London Oratory
- Ross Douthat: American conservative political analyst, blogger, author and opinion columnist at The New York Times
- David Paul Drach: French Talmudic scholar and librarian of the College of Propaganda in Rome
- Augusta Theodosia Drane: English writer and theologian, also known as Mother Francis Raphael, O.S.D
- John Dryden: English poet, literary critic, and playwright
- Avery Dulles: American Jesuit theologian, professor at Fordham University; son of former Secretary of State John Foster Dulles
- Michael Dummett: British Analytic philosopher who devised the Quota Borda system
- Michael Dunn: Dwarf, actor. Wanted to become a Catholic friar, but found that his small stature and frame made getting around the monastery impossible.
- Faye Dunaway: American actress
- Joseph Dutton: veteran of the American Civil War who worked with Father Damien

=== E ===
- Martin Eisengrein: German theologian and polemicist
- Ulf Ekman: Swedish charismatic pastor and founder of the Livets Ord congregation of the Word of Faith movement in Uppsala, Sweden
- Black Elk: Oglala medicine man
- Charles II of England: King of England, Scotland and Ireland from 1685 to 1688; converted from Anglicanism in 1685 just before his death.
- Henrietta of England: English Princess. She was baptized in the Church of England. After her father's death, she was confirmed and raised in the Catholic Church, to which her mother belonged.
- James II of England: King of England and Ireland as James II, and King of Scotland as James VII, from 6 February 1685 until he was deposed in the Revolution of 1688. He was the last Catholic monarch of England, Scotland and Ireland; his reign is now remembered primarily for struggles over religious tolerance. He converted from Anglicanism to Catholicism in 1668 or 1669
- Veit Erbermann: German theologian and controversialist
- William Everson: Beat poet whose parents were Christian Scientists; took the name Brother Antoninus in the 18 years he spent as a Dominican
- Thomas Ewing: U.S. Senator from Ohio; served as Secretary of the Treasury and first Secretary of the Interior; foster brother of William Tecumseh Sherman

=== F ===
- Frederick William Faber: English theologian and hymnwriter
- Lola Falana: dancer and actress who became a Catholic evangelist after converting; founded The Lambs of God Ministry
- Fan Shouyi (or Luigi Fan): first known Chinese person to travel to Europe, return, and write an account of his travels. In 1717, he was ordained as a priest and would eventually be an interpreter for the Chinese emperor and as a missionary in his native China.
- Susan Feilding, Countess of Denbigh: English courtier and First Lady of the Bedchamber to Queen Henrietta Maria. She converted from Anglicanism to Catholicism in France.
- Leonid Feodorov: exarch of the Russian Greek Catholic Church; Gulag survivor; beatified by Pope John Paul II
- Ronald Firbank: British novelist
- Sir Henry Fletcher, 3rd Baronet, of Hutton le Forest: converted and spent his last years in a monastery
- Henry IV of France: King of France and Navarre; converted from calvinism in 1593.
- Kasper Franck: German theologian and controversialist
- Antonia Fraser: British historian, biographer and novelist; her parents converted when she was young
- Johann Jakob Froberger: German composer
- André Frossard: French journalist and essayist
- Lady Georgiana Fullerton: English novelist; converted in 1846 when she was in her 30s
- Allan Fung: American politician

=== G ===
- Ivan Gagarin: Russian Jesuit and writer of aristocratic origin
- Maggie Gallagher: conservative activist; a founder of the National Organization for Marriage
- Mark Galli: American author, former editor of Christianity Today, and former Evangelical Protestant minister
- Peter Geach: English philosopher and professor of logic at the University of Leeds. Husband of Elizabeth Anscombe
- Edmund Gennings and John Gennings: brothers; Edmund was a priest and martyr who converted at sixteen; his death lead to John's conversion; John restored the English province of Franciscan friars
- Elizabeth Fox-Genovese: historian; founder of the Institute of Women's Studies; wife of Eugene D. Genovese
- Eugene D. Genovese: historian; was once an atheist and Marxist
- Fathia Ghali: daughter of King Fuad I of Egypt and his Queen, Nazli Sabri; in 1950, both mother and daughter converted to Catholicism from Islam; this enraged King Farouk, who forbade them from returning to Egypt; after his death, they asked President Anwar Sadat to restore their passports, which he did
- Vladimir Ghika: Romanian nobleman who became a Catholic monsignor and political dissident
- Richard Gilmour: bishop of the Catholic Diocese of Cleveland
- Newt Gingrich: American politician; Speaker of the United States House of Representatives
- Dawn Eden Goldstein: rock journalist who was raised Reform Jewish; was agnostic, now a Catholic theologian and author
- Rumer Godden: English author of Black Narcissus and the 1972 Whitbread Award winner The Diddakoi; converted to Catholicism in 1968, which inspired the book In This House of Brede
- Jonathan Goodall: Anglican Bishop of Ebbsfleet from 2013 to 2021, converted in September 2021
- John Gother: English Catholic convert, priest and controversialist
- John Willem Gran: former Bishop of Oslo; had been an atheist working in the film industry
- Jennifer Granholm: United States Secretary of Energy and 47th Governor of Michigan
- John Grey: English poet and Catholic priest. It has often been suggested that he was the inspiration behind Oscar Wilde's fictional Dorian Gray despite evidence to the contrary.
- Graham Greene: British writer whose Catholicism influenced novels like The Power and the Glory, although in later life he once referred to himself as a "Catholic atheist"
- Wilton Daniel Gregory: American Archbishop of Washington, 2019–present
- Moritz Gudenus: German priest
- Alec Guinness: British actor, after whom the Catholic Association of Performing Arts named an award
- Ruffa Gutierrez: Filipina actress, model and former beauty queen; converted from Christianity to Islam and back to Christianity

=== H ===
- Cyrus Habib: U.S. politician turned Jesuit
- Fabrice Hadjadj: French writer and philosopher
- Theodor Haecker: German writer, translator and cultural critic
- Kimberly Hahn: former Presbyterian; theologian, apologist and author of many books
- Scott Hahn: former Presbyterian minister; theologian, scripture scholar and author of many books
- Jeffrey Hamm: British fascist leader; converted by the renegade Catholic priest Fr. Clement Russell; succeeded Oswald Mosley as head of the British Union of Fascists
- Thomas Morton Harper: Jesuit priest, philosopher, theologian and preacher
- Chris Haw: theologian and author of numerous books, including From Willow Creek to Sacred Heart, which detailed his conversion away from evangelical Protestantism
- Anna Haycraft: raised in Auguste Comte's atheistic "church of humanity", but became a conservative Catholic in adulthood
- Bill Hayden: Australian politician and Governor-General of Australia, converted from atheism at age 85 after retirement from public office.
- Carlton J. H. Hayes: American ambassador to Spain; helped found the American Catholic Historical Association; co-chair of the National Conference of Christians and Jews
- Susan Hayward: Academy Award-winning American actress who helped found a church
- Isaac Hecker: founder of the Paulist Fathers
- Elisabeth Amalie of Hesse-Darmstadt: German princess who became Electress Palatine; converted from lutheranism in 1653.
- Elisabeth Hesselblad: raised Lutheran; after her conversion, became a nun; beatified by Pope John Paul II on 9 April 2000; recognized by Yad Vashem in 2004 as one of the Righteous Among the Nations for her work in helping Jews during World War II
- Dietrich von Hildebrand: German theologian
- H.H. Holmes: Chicago serial killer portrayed in Erik Larson's The Devil in the White City; allegedly converted in Philadelphia's Moyamensing Prison, about a week before he was executed in 1896
- Walter Hooper: trustee and literary advisor of the estate of C. S. Lewis
- James Hope-Scott: English lawyer connected to the Oxford Movement
- Gerard Manley Hopkins: English poet and Catholic priest
- Trent Horn: American Catholic apologist and author
- Deal Hudson: Philosopher, publisher, political activist; converted from Southern Baptist to Catholicism at age 34.
- Francis Hsu (Chen-Ping): third bishop of Hong Kong, and the first Chinese one; a convert from Methodism
- Arcadio Huang: Chinese Christian convert, and brought to Paris by the Missions étrangères. He took a pioneering role in the teaching of the Chinese language in France around 1715.
- Allen Hunt: American radio personality; former Methodist pastor
- E. Howard Hunt: American spy and novelist
- Reinhard Hütter: American theologian
- Anne Hyde: English noblewoman who was the first wife of James, Duke of York, who later became King James II and VII.

=== I ===
- Laura Ingraham: American broadcaster and political commentator
- Vyacheslav Ivanov: poet and playwright associated with Russian symbolism; received into the Catholic Church in 1926
- Michael Iskander: Egyptian-born American actor and musician. He converted to Catholicism from Coptic Orthodox Church and announced his conversion in an Instagram post in 2025.
- Levi Silliman Ives: Episcopal Church of the USA Bishop of North Carolina

=== J ===
- Władysław II Jagiełło: Grand Duke of Lithuania who became King of Poland; converted from Lithuanian polytheism in 1386.
- James II of England: King of England and Ireland as James II, and King of Scotland as James VII, from 6 February 1685 until he was deposed in the Revolution of 1688. He was the last Catholic monarch of England, Scotland and Ireland; his reign is now remembered primarily for struggles over religious tolerance. He converted from Anglicanism to Catholicism in 1668 or 1669
- Bobby Jindal: American politician who served as the 55th Governor of Louisiana from 2008 to 2016; converted in his teens
- Gwen John: artist; Auguste Rodin's lover; after the relationship she had a religious conversion and did portraits of nuns
- Abby Johnson: former Planned Parenthood clinic director; converted to Catholicism in 2011, two years after her anti-abortion conversion in 2009
- Bobby Jones: Golf pioneer. Converted on his deathbed in 1971
- James Earl Jones: American actor who converted during his service in the U.S. Army
- Walter B. Jones: U.S. politician; Member of the United States House of Representatives
- Nirmala Joshi: Superior General of the Missionaries of Charity, 1997–2009
- Johannes Jørgensen: Danish writer, known for his biographies of Catholic saints
- Ernst Jünger: decorated German soldier, author, and entomologist who became publicly known for his World War I memoir Storm of Steel. Converted shortly before his death at the age of 102

=== K ===
- Nicholas Kao Se Tseien: world's oldest priest
- David Kawānanakoa: Prince of the Hawaiian Kingdom; converted from Anglicanism in 1907.
- Katharine, Duchess of Kent: first member of the British royal family to convert to Catholicism for more than 300 years
- Joyce Kilmer: American journalist, poet, literary critic, lecturer and editor
- Yuna Kim: South Korean figure skater and Olympic gold medalist
- Russell Kirk: American historian, moralist and figure in US Conservatism
- Sister Gregory Kirkus: English Catholic nun, educator, historian and archivist
- Harm Klueting: priest and historian; had been Lutheran and had two children
- Ronald Knox: English Catholic priest, theologian, author, and radio broadcaster. Ordained an Anglican priest in 1912, Knox converted to Catholicism in 1917. He is known for his translation of the bible, the Knox Bible, published in 1955
- Dean Koontz: American novelist known for thrillers and suspense; converted in college
- Knud Karl Krogh-Tonning: Norwegian; had been a Lutheran professor of theology
- Albert Küchler: Danish painter who became a Franciscan friar
- Lawrence Kudlow: CNBC host and business columnist
- Sigiswald Kuijken: Belgian violinist, violist and conductor
- William Kurelek: Canadian painter
- Stephan Kuttner: expert in canon law
- Demetrios Kydones: Byzantine theologian, writer and statesman

=== L ===
- Shia LaBeouf: American actor, performance artist, and filmmaker; converted following an extended period preparing for a role playing Padre Pio
- La Malinche: Nahua woman, who became known for contributing to the Spanish conquest of the Aztec Empire (1519–1521), by acting as an interpreter, advisor, and intermediary for the Spanish conquistador Hernán Cortés. She was baptized in the Roman Catholic Church and given the Christian name "Marina".
- Charlie Landsborough: singer songwriter
- Karl Landsteiner: Austrian biologist and physician; received the 1930 Nobel Prize in Physiology or Medicine; converted from Judaism to Catholicism in 1890
- Joseph Lane: Territorial Governor of Oregon; first U.S. Senator from Oregon; pro-slavery Democratic candidate for US Vice President in 1860; openly sympathetic to the Confederacy during the Civil War; studied Catholic doctrine and converted with his family in 1867
- John Lawe, Wisconsin Territory fur trader and land magnate. Lawe, who was of Jewish background, was baptised a Protestant, and had served as vestryman and treasurer of Wisconsin's first Episcopalian church, was reported to have made a deathbed conversion to Catholicism, and was buried in a Catholic cemetery next to his wife Thérèse. Local speculation was that the purpose of his conversion was to allow this burial.
- Halldór Laxness: Icelandic writer; received the 1955 Nobel Prize in Literature; converted in 1923; left the Church, but returned at the end of his life
- Graham Leonard: former Anglican Bishop of London
- Ignace Lepp: French psychiatrist whose parents were freethinkers; joined the Communist party at age fifteen; broke with the party in 1937 and eventually became a Catholic priest
- Shane Leslie: Irish-born diplomat and writer. He was a first cousin of Winston Churchill
- Dilwyn Lewis: Welsh clothes designer and priest
- Li Yingshi: Ming-era Chinese military officer and a renowned mathematician, astrologer and feng shui expert, who was among the first Chinese literati to become Christian
- Francis Libermann: venerated Catholic, raised in Orthodox Judaism; has been called "the second founder of the Holy Ghost Fathers"
- Antonio Ligabue: Italian painter of Swiss birth
- Luca Lionello: being an atheist for 40 years, this Italian actor converted when he was part of the cast of the 2004 epic drama The Passion of the Christ, playing Judas Ischkariot
- William Lockhart: first member of the Oxford Movement to convert and become a Catholic priest
- James Longstreet: Confederate general turned Republican "scalawag"
- Emily Loveday: her father caused a fuss when he discovered that she had been converted while at boarding school in Paris.
- Baldassare Diego Loyola (born Muhammad el-Attaz): Moroccan prince. He became a Jesuit priest and devoted himself to the evangelization of Muslims.
- Frederick Lucas: Quaker who converted and founded The Tablet
- Clare Boothe Luce: American playwright, editor, politician, and diplomat; wife of Time-Life founder Henry Luce;worked on the screenplay of the nun-themed film Come to the Stable; became a Dame of Malta
- Arnold Lunn: skier, mountaineer, and writer; agnostic; wrote Roman Converts, which took a critical view of Catholicism and the converts to it; later converted to Catholicism due to debating with converts, and became an apologist for the faith
- Jean-Marie Lustiger: Catholic Archbishop of Paris, 1981–2005; a Cardinal
- James Patterson Lyke: Catholic Archbishop of Atlanta, 1991–1992
- Jan Lipsansky: Czech writer

=== M ===
- Empress Dowager Ma (Southern Ming): concubine of the Prince Duan of Gui and mother of the Yongli Emperor
- Alasdair MacIntyre: virtue ethicist and moral philosopher
- Gustav Mahler: Austrian composer; converted from Judaism. There is disagreement whether his conversion was a genuine or pragmatic one to overcome institutional and professional barriers against Jews
- Enrique de Malaca: Malay slave of Ferdinand Magellan; converted to Catholicism after being purchased in 1511
- Henry Edward Manning: English Anglican clergyman who became a Catholic Cardinal and Archbishop of Westminster
- Gabriel Marcel: leading Christian existentialist; his upbringing was agnostic
- Jacques Maritain: French Thomist philosopher; helped form the basis for international law and human rights law in his writings; also laid the intellectual foundation for the Christian democratic movement
- Taylor Marshall: American former Anglican priest, now a Catholic author and YouTuber/podcaster.
- Tobie Matthew: Member of English Parliament who became a Catholic priest
- Robert L. May: creator of Rudolph the Red-Nosed Reindeer; converted from Judaism after marrying his second wife, a Catholic.
- Virginia Mayo: American stage, movie and television actress, wife of actor Michael O'Shea: (The Princess and the Pirate, The Best Years of Our Lives, The Secret Life of Walter Mitty, The Silver Chalice etc.); converted by Bishop Fulton Sheen.
- James McAuley: Australian poet; converted in 1952
- Claude McKay: bisexual Jamaican poet; went from Communist-leaning atheist to an active Catholic Christian after a stroke
- Gavin McInnes: Canadian far-right activist. Founder of the Proud Boys.
- Marshall McLuhan: Canadian philosopher of communication theory; coined the terms "the medium is the message" and "global village"; converted in 1937 after reading the works of G.K. Chesterton
- Duchess Charlotte Frederica of Mecklenburg-Schwerin: German Princess who married in Danish Royal Family beforme divorced and converted from lutheranism to catholicism in 1830.
- Henriette Mendel: German actress, and the mistress and, later, morganatic wife of Ludwig Wilhelm, Duke in Bavaria.
- Carlos Menem: Argentine lawyer and politician who served as the president of Argentina for ten years, from 1989 to 1999. He converted from Islam to Catholicism.
- Anton Raphael Mengs: German Neoclassical painter who converted in 1754.
- Thomas Merton: American Trappist monk and spiritual writer
- Vittorio Messori: Italian journalist and writer called the "most translated Catholic writer in the world" by Sandro Magister; before his conversion in 1964 he had a "perspective as a secularist and agnostic"
- Frank Meyer: American conservative political philosopher; converted on his deathbed in 1972
- Alice Meynell: poet and suffragist
- Czesław Miłosz: poet, prose writer, translator and diplomat; awarded the Neustadt International Prize for Literature and the 1980 Nobel Prize in Literature
- Michelle Mone, Baroness Mone: Scottish businesswoman and life peeress
- Elena of Montenegro: Montenegrin Princess who became Queen of Italy; converted from Eastern Orthodoxy in 1896.
- John Brande Morris: priest, writer, student of Patristic theology, and scholar of the Syriac language
- Henry Morse: one of the Forty Martyrs of England and Wales
- Malcolm Muggeridge: British journalist and author who went from agnosticism to the Catholic Church
- William Munk: English physician and medical historian remembered chiefly for "Munk's Roll", a biographical reference work on the Royal College of Physicians.

=== N ===
- Takashi Nagai: physician specializing in radiology; author of The Bells of Nagasaki
- Bernard Nathanson: Jewish convert and medical doctor; a founding member of NARAL; he later recanted and became an anti-abortion proponent
- Michael Nazir-Ali: Anglican Bishop of Rochester from 1994 to 2009. Currently the director of the Oxford Centre for Training, Research, Advocacy and Dialogue. Converted to Catholicism in 2021, ordained a priest for the Anglican Ordinariate
- Ronaldo Luís Nazário de Lima: Brazilian footballer; baptized as a Catholic in 2023.
- Patricia Neal: won the Academy Award for Best Actress for her role in Hud
- Knut Ansgar Nelson: Danish-born convert who was a bishop of the Catholic Diocese of Stockholm
- Irène Némirovsky: author of the controversial David Golder, autobiographical Le Vin de solitude, and posthumous success Suite française
- Princess Christina of the Netherlands: Dutch Princess who converted from calvinism in 1992.
- Princess Irene of the Netherlands: Dutch Princess who was married to the head of the ducal House of Bourbon-Parma; converted from calvinism in 1963.
- Richard John Neuhaus: priest; founder and editor of the journal First Things
- John Henry Newman: English priest and cardinal, former Anglican priest, famous for his autobiographical book Apologia Pro Vita Sua in which he details his reasons for converting
- Keith Newton: formerly an Anglican bishop
- Donald Nicholl: British historian and theologian who has been described as "one of the most widely influential of modern Christian thinkers"
- Barthold Nihus: German convert who became a bishop and controversialist
- Robert Novak: American journalist and political commentator; raised Jewish, but practiced no religion for many years before converting to Catholicism in the last years of his life
- Alfred Noyes: English poet, best known for "The Highwayman"; dealt with his conversion in The Unknown God; The Last Voyage, in his The Torch-Bearers trilogy, was influenced by his conversion

=== O ===
- Frederick Oakeley: priest and author known for his translation of "Adeste Fideles" into English as "O Come, All Ye Faithful"
- John M. Oesterreicher: Jewish convert who became a monsignor and a leading advocate of Jewish-Catholic reconciliation
- William E. Orchard: liturgist, pacifist and ecumenicist; before becoming a Catholic priest he was a Protestant minister
- Domenico Ottomano (born Osman): alleged Ottoman prince and Dominican friar
- Karim Ouchikh: French lawyer and politician of Algerian (Kabylie) origin.
- Malika Oufkir: Moroccan Berber writer and former victim of enforced disappearance. She is the daughter of General Mohamed Oufkir. She and her siblings are converts from Islam to Catholicism.
- Johann Friedrich Overbeck: German painter in the Nazarene movement of religious art
- Candace Owens: American political commentator; converted from Protestantism to Catholicism in 2024.

=== P ===
- Shams Pahlavi: Iranian Princess and elder sister of Mohammad Reza Pahlavi, the last Shah of Iran. She converted in 1940s.
- Mehrdad Pahlbod: Iranian politician who served as the first culture minister of Iran from 1964 until 1978. He was married to Shams Pahlavi with who he converted.
- Edward, Count Palatine of Simmern: German Prince; converted from Calvinism in 1645.
- Elizabeth Charlotte of the Palatinate: German Princess who became Duchess of Orléans; converted in 1671 from Calvinism.
- Louise Hollandine of the Palatinate: German Princess who became nun in the Cistercian Maubuisson Abbey; converted from Calvinism in 1657.
- Wolfgang Wilhelm, Count Palatine of Neuburg: German Prince who was Count Palatine of Neuburg and Duke of Jülich and Berg; converted from lutheranism in 1613.
- Barbara Palmer, 1st Duchess of Cleveland: English royal mistress of the Villiers family and perhaps the most notorious of the many mistresses of King Charles II of England; converted from Anglicanism in 1663.
- Coventry Patmore: English poet and critic known for The Angel in the House
- Joseph Pearce: anti-Catholic and agnostic British National Front member; became a devoted Catholic writer with a series on EWTN
- Vladimir Pecherin: Russian convert and priest whose memoirs were controversial for criticizing both the Russian government and the Catholic Church of his time
- Charles Péguy: French poet, essayist, and editor; went from an agnostic humanist to a pro-Republic Catholic
- Walker Percy: Laetare Medal-winning author of The Moviegoer and Love in the Ruins
- Sarah Peter: American philanthropist; daughter of Ohio governor Thomas Worthington
- Johann Pistorius: German controversialist and historian
- Augustus III of Poland: German Prince who became King of Poland, Grand Duke of Lithuania and Elector of Saxony; converted from lutheranism in 1712.
- John Hungerford Pollen: wrote for The Tablet; Professor of Fine Arts at the Catholic University of Ireland
- Ramesh Ponnuru: American conservative political pundit and journalist
- Kirsten Powers: American political analyst & fox news columnist.
- Agni Pratistha: Indonesian actress, model and former beauty queen; elected Puteri Indonesia 2006; converted to Catholicism after marriage, although initially denied rumors of conversion
- Carrie Prejean: American model, Former Miss California USA 2009 and Miss USA 2009 first runner-up. Raised in an evangelical household, she converted to catholicism in 2025.
- Vincent Price: American actor; converted to Catholicism to marry his third wife, Australian actress Coral Browne (she became an American citizen for him); he reportedly lost interest in the faith after her death
- Erik Prince: founder of Blackwater Worldwide
- Anna of Prussia: German Princess who was Landgravine of Hesse-Kassel; converted from lutheranism in 1901.
- Marie of Prussia: German Princess who became Queen consort of Bavaria; converted from lutheranism in 1874.
- Augustus Pugin: English-born architect, designer and theorist of design; known for Gothic Revival architecture; advocate for reviving the Catholic Church in England

=== R ===
- Marc-André Raffalovich: French poet and writer on homosexuality. He converted in 1896 and joined the tertiary order of the Dominicans.
- Rain: South Korean singer, songwriter, dancer, actor, and record producer. He converted to catholicism in 2014.
- Lucile Randon: French supercentenarian who, until her death at the age of 118 years, 340 days, was the world's oldest verified living person. She was also the oldest nun ever lived. She converted from Protestantism in 1923 at the age of 19.
- Marie-Alphonse Ratisbonne: co-founder of the Congregation of Our Lady of Sion, which originally worked to convert Jewish people like himself
- Marie Theodor Ratisbonne: co-founder of the Congregation of Our Lady of Sion; converted before his brother
- Sally Read: Eric Gregory Award-winning poet who converted to Catholicism
- Joseph Warren Revere: American Union army General and grandson of Paul Revere; converted in 1862 during the Civil War
- William Reynolds: English Catholic theologian and Biblical scholar
- Dewi Rezer: Indonesian model of French descent; converted to Catholicism
- Anthony Rhodes: English writer
- Paul Richardson: formerly an Anglican bishop
- Brent Robbins: Associate Professor of Psychology at Point Park University in Pittsburgh, Pennsylvania
- Knute Rockne: Norwegian-American Notre Dame football coach, 1918–1930; converted from Lutheranism
- Alban Roe: Benedictine; one of the Forty Martyrs of England and Wales
- Frederick Rolfe ("Baron Corvo"): English writer; his Hadrian the Seventh concerns a fictional Papal Conclave
- Lila Rose: American president of anti-abortion organization Live Action
- Sylvester Horton Rosecrans: first bishop of the Catholic Diocese of Columbus
- William Rosecrans: Sylvester's brother, a Union Army general in the American Civil War
- Anthony Ross: Scottish priest who served as Rector of the University of Edinburgh from 1979 to 1982
- Jonathan Roumie: American actor best known for playing the role of Jesus Christ in television series The Chosen
- Joseph Rovan: historian, member of the French Resistance, adviser on Franco-German relations
- Peter Paul Rubens: Flemish artist and diplomat. He is considered the most influential artist of the Flemish Baroque tradition. He converted from Calvinism.
- Giuni Russo: Italian singer-songwriter, developed a devotion to Saint Teresa of Avila
- Richard Rutt: Catholic Monsignor, member of the House of Lords, served as a missionary to Korea and as Bishop of Daejon in the Anglican Church of Korea and the Suffragan Bishop of Turo in the Church of England, prominent Korean Studies Scholar

=== S ===
- Nazli Sabri: Queen of Egypt; mother of King Farouk of Egypt
- Siegfried Sassoon: English poet, writer and soldier; converted in 1957
- Joseph Saurin: French mathematician and Calvinist minister
- Princess Beatrice of Saxe-Coburg and Gotha: British Princess who married into the Spanish royal family; converted from lutheranism in 1913.
- Prince Ferdinand of Saxe-Coburg and Gotha: German Prince and a general of cavalry in the Austrian Imperial and Royal Army during the Napoleonic Wars; converted from lutheranism in 1818.
- Paul Schenck: converted from Judaism to Episcopalianism to Catholicism; currently a Catholic priest and anti-abortion activist
- Heinrich Schlier: German theologian
- Roy Schoeman: former Harvard Professor, lecturer, and Jewish convert to Catholicism
- Rob Schneider: American actor; converted to Catholicism in 2023 after having been raised by a Jewish father and a Catholic mother.
- Dutch Schultz (Arthur Flegenheimer): American mobster; converted to Catholicism during his second trial, convinced that Jesus Christ had spared him jail time; after being fatally shot by underworld rivals, he asked to see a priest and was given the last rites; his mother insisted on dressing him in a Jewish prayer shawl prior to his interment in the Catholic Gate of Heaven Cemetery
- E. F. Schumacher: economic thinker known for Small Is Beautiful; his A Guide for the Perplexed criticizes what he termed "materialistic scientism"; went from atheism to Buddhism to Catholicism
- Countess of Ségur: French writer of Russian birth
- John Sergeant: English priest, controversialist and theologian
- Elizabeth Ann Seton: first native-born citizen of the United States to be canonized by the Catholic Church
- Zaida of Seville: Former Muslim princess, formerly associated with the Abbadid dynasty, who became a mistress and then perhaps wife of king Alfonso VI of Castile.
- Frances Shand Kydd: mother of Diana, Princess of Wales
- Michael Alphonsius Shen Fu-Tsung: Qing Dynasty bureaucrat who toured Europe; he was featured in a painting titled "The Chinese Convert" by Godfrey Kneller
- Frank Sheed: Australian-born lawyer, writer, publisher, Catholic apologist and speaker. Raised by a Scottish Presbyterian father, he later converted at age 16, and devoted his life to defending the Catholic faith, mostly from Protestant critics.
- William Tecumseh Sherman: Civil War General, was born into a Presbyterian family but raised in a Catholic household by foster parents after his father died. Sherman attended the Catholic Church until the outbreak of the Civil War, which destroyed his faith. His wife and children were Catholic and one son, Thomas Ewing Sherman, became a Jesuit priest.
- Ralph Sherwin: one of the Forty Martyrs of England and Wales
- Frederick Charles Shrady: American religious artist, primarily of sculpture
- Angelus Silesius: German Catholic priest and physician, known as a mystic and religious poet
- David Silk: formerly an Anglican bishop
- Richard Simpson: literary writer and scholar; wrote a biography of Edmund Campion
- Edith Sitwell: British poet and critic
- Delia Smith: English cook and television presenter; her books A Feast for Lent and A Feast for Advent involve Catholicism
- Timo Soini: politician who leads the Eurosceptic True Finns party; converted during the time of Pope John Paul II
- Isabel de Solís: Spanish slave concubine and later the wife of Abu l-Hasan Ali, Sultan of Granada. She was originally a Christian from Castile, she converted to Islam under the name of Zoraya. However, after the fall of Granada, she took up the name of Isabel again and reverted back to Catholicism.
- Lauren Southern: Canadian political activist and YouTuber.
- Reinhard Sorge: expressionist playwright who went from Nietzschean to Catholic
- Wesley Sneijder: Dutch soccer player
- Etsuro Sotoo: Japanese sculptor
- Queen Sofía of Spain: Greek Princess who became Queen consort of Spain; converted from Greek Orthodoxy in 1962.
- Muriel Spark: Scottish novelist, author of The Prime of Miss Jean Brodie; Penelope Fitzgerald states that Spark said that after her conversion she was better able to, "see human existence as a whole, as a novelist needs to do"
- Ignatius Spencer: son of George Spencer, 2nd Earl Spencer; became a Passionist priest and worked for the conversion of England to the Catholic faith
- Adrienne von Speyr: Swiss medical doctor and later Catholic mystic
- Henri Spondanus: French jurist, historian, continuator of the Annales Ecclesiastici, and Bishop of Pamiers
- Barbara Stanwyck: American actress, model, and dancer
- Friedrich Staphylus: German theologian who drew up several opinions on reform for the Council of Trent despite not attending
- Ellen Gates Starr: a founder of Hull House who became an Oblate of the Third Order of St. Benedict
- Jeffrey N. Steenson: first ordinary to the Personal Ordinariate of the Chair of Saint Peter; former bishop of the Episcopal Diocese of the Rio Grande
- Edith Stein: phenomenologist Jewish philosopher who converted to Catholicism and then became a Discalced Carmelite nun; declared a saint by John Paul II
- Göran Stenius: Swedish-Finnish writer whose Klockorna i Rom (The Bells of Rome) has been praised as a post-war religious novel
- Nicolas Steno: pioneer in geology and anatomy who converted from Lutheranism; became a bishop, wrote spiritual works, and was beatified in 1988
- Karl Stern: German-Canadian neurologist and psychiatrist; his book Pillar of Fire concerns his conversion
- John Lawson Stoddard: divinity student who became an agnostic and "scientific humanist"; later converted to Catholicism
- Sven Stolpe: Swedish convert and writer
- R. J. Stove: Australian writer, editor, and composer; raised atheist as the son of David Stove
- Su Xuelin: Chinese author and scholar whose semi-autobiographical novel Bitter Heart discusses her introduction to and conversion to Catholicism
- Graham Sutherland: English artist who did religious art and had a fascination with Christ's crucifixion
- Halliday Sutherland: doctor, tuberculosis pioneer, best-selling author and defendant in the 1923 libel trial, Stopes v. Sutherland. Converted in 1919.
- Robert Sutton: English priest and martyr
- Astrid of Sweden: Swedish Princess who became Queen of the Belgians; converted from lutheranism in 1930.
- Cecilia of Sweden: Swedish Princess who became Margravine of Baden-Rodemachern; converted from lutheranism in 1577.
- Christina, Queen of Sweden: Queen of Sweden from 1632 to 1654; converted from lutheranism in 1654.
- Sophie Swetchine: Russian salon-holder and mystic
- Susie Forrest Swift (Sister M. Imelda Teresa; 1862–1916), American editor, Salvation Army worker, Catholic nun
- Karel Schulz: Czech writer

=== T ===
- John B. Tabb: American poet, priest, and educator
- Hara Takashi (原 敬): Japanese politician who served as the Prime Minister of Japan from 1918 to 1921. Baptized at the age of 17
- John Michael Talbot: American Catholic singer-songwriter-guitarist, once a secular musician in the group Mason Proffit
- Allen Tate: American poet, essayist and social commentator, and Poet Laureate Consultant in Poetry to the Library of Congress
- Frances Margaret Taylor: founded the Poor Servants of the Mother of God
- Kateri Tekakwitha: Catholic saint informally known as "Lily of the Mohawks"
- Tabaraji of Ternate: Indonesian sultan; converted to Catholicism after 1534; baptised with the name Dom Manuel
- Clarence Thomas: American lawyer and jurist who has served as an associate justice of the Supreme Court of the United States. He converted from Baptist Church to Catholicism.
- Elliot Griffin Thomas: third bishop for the Catholic Diocese of Saint Thomas
- Elizabeth Thompson: British battle painter most famous for The Roll Call, converted along with her family in 1873.
- John Sparrow David Thompson: first Catholic to be Prime Minister of Canada
- Meletius Tipaldi: Eastern Catholic bishop, from Orthodox Christianity.
- Alice B. Toklas: American-born member of the Parisian avant-garde of the early 20th century; had once been Gertrude Stein's lover
- Casilda of Toledo: Former Muslim princess, the daughter of the emir of Taifa of Toledo. She showed great kindness to Christian captives before here conversion to catholicism. She is now a saint of the Catholic Church.
- Edith Tolkien: Englishwoman, known as the wife and muse of novelist J. R. R. Tolkien. Converted in 1913 in order to marry her husband
- Mabel Tolkien: Mother of English writer, poet, philologist, and academic J. R. R. Tolkien. Converted from being a Baptist in 1900
- Meriol Trevor: British biographer, novelist and children's writer
- Lu Zhengxiang: Chinese Premier and diplomat who became a Benedictine abbot and priest "Pierre-Célestin"
- Hasekura Tsunenaga: Samurai and Keichō diplomat who toured Europe
- Rajah Tupas: Filipino prince and son of the Rajah Humabon; converted with his family by Magellan
- Malcolm Turnbull: 29th Prime Minister of Australia.
- Julia Gardiner Tyler: second wife of U.S. President John Tyler

=== U ===
- Barry Ulanov: editor of Metronome magazine; a founder of the St. Thomas More Society; Mary Lou Williams's godfather
- Kaspar Ulenberg: theological writer and translator of the Bible who had previously been Lutheran
- Sigrid Undset: Norwegian Nobel laureate who had previously been agnostic

=== V ===
- Sheldon Vanauken: author of A Severe Mercy; a contributing editor of the New Oxford Review
- JD Vance: 50th vice president of the United States
- Carola of Vasa: Titular Swedish Princess who became the last Queen of Saxony; converted from lutheranism.
- Bill Veeck: American baseball team owner
- Johann Emanuel Veith: Bohemian Catholic preacher
- Jean-Baptiste Ventura: soldier, mercenary and adventurer of Jewish origin
- Aubrey Thomas de Vere: Victorian era poet and critic.
- Johannes Vermeer: Dutch Golden Age painter
- Adrian Vermeule: American legal scholar and law professor at Harvard Law School
- Francis Verney: English adventurer, soldier of fortune, and pirate. He converted from Anglicanism to Islam in 1610 but after, he converted to Catholicism in 1614.
- Mother Veronica of the Passion: founder of the Sisters of the Apostolic Carmel
- Eva Vlaardingerbroek: Dutch political commentator and activist; converted to Catholicism from Protestantism alongside her father in 2023.
- Karl Freiherr von Vogelsang: politician and editor of the Catholic newspaper Das Vaterland
- Simeon Vratanja: Eastern Catholic bishop

=== W ===
- The Empress Dowager Wang of the Southern Ming Dynasty and mother of the Yongli Emperor
- William George Ward: theologian, philosopher, lecturer in mathematics
- E. I. Watkin: English writer on poetry, philosophy, aesthetics, history, and religion. Friend of Christopher Dawson. Converted in 1908 from Anglicanism
- Evelyn Waugh: English writer; his Brideshead Revisited concerns an aristocratic Catholic family
- John Wayne: American actor, known for his roles in war films and Westerns; converted to the Catholic Church shortly before his death.
- Ben Weasel: American musician, lead singer and guitarist of the punk rock band Screeching Weasel; he converted from Buddhism.
- Yvonne Maria Werner: Swedish historian and professor
- Zacharias Werner: German poet, dramatist and preacher
- Eustace White: one of the Forty Martyrs of England and Wales
- E. T. Whittaker: English mathematician who was awarded the cross Pro Ecclesia et Pontifice in 1935
- Ann Widdecombe: former British Conservative Party politician; novelist since 2000
- Chelsea Olivia Wijaya: Indonesian actress and model; born in the Protestant religion
- Robert William Wilcox: soldier and politician in 19th century Hawaii.
- Oscar Wilde: Irish writer and poet; converted on his deathbed
- Mary Lou Williams: jazz pianist; after conversion, wrote and performed some religious jazz music like Black Christ of the Andes
- Paul Williams: academic who was raised Anglican and lived as a Tibetan Buddhist for twenty years before becoming Catholic
- Tennessee Williams: American playwright; converted in his later years as his life spiralled downwards
- Sigi Wimala: Indonesian model and actress, converted to Catholicism after marriage
- Lord Nicholas Windsor: son of Catholic convert Katharine, Duchess of Kent; anti-abortion writer
- Rhoda Wise: American mystic & stigmatist
- Charlene Wittstock: Former South-African Olympic swimmer who became Princess of Monaco; converted from Protestantism in 2011.
- Gene Wolfe: Damon Knight Memorial Grand Master in science fiction and fantasy
- John Woodcock: among the Eighty-five martyrs of England and Wales
- Thomas Woods: American historian and Austrian School economist; wrote How the Catholic Church Built Western Civilization
- John C. Wright: science fiction author who went from atheist to Catholic; wrote Chapter 1 of the book Atheist to Catholic: 11 Stories of Conversion, edited by Rebecca Vitz Cherico
- John Michael Wright: portrait painter in the Baroque style
- John Ching Hsiung Wu: wrote Chinese Humanism and Christian spirituality; has been called "one of China's chief lay exponents of Catholic ideas"
- Wu Li: Chinese painter and poet who became one of the first Chinese Jesuit priests
- Elisabeth of Württemberg: German Princess who was a duchess of Württemberg by birth and an archduchess of Austria by her marriage; converted from lutheranism in 1788.

=== X ===
- Xu Guangqi: Chinese scholar-bureaucrat, agricultural scientist, astronomer, and mathematician during the Ming Dynasty; classed as one of the Three Pillars of Chinese Catholicism

=== Y ===
- Shigeru Yoshida (吉田 茂): Japanese diplomat and politician who served as Prime Minister of Japan from 1946 to 1947 and from 1948 to 1954. He was baptized on his deathbed, having hid his Catholicism throughout most of his life. His funeral was held in St. Mary's Cathedral, Tokyo

=== Z ===
- Israel Zolli : until converting from Judaism to Catholicism in February 1945, Zolli was the chief rabbi in Rome, Italy's Jewish community from 1940 to 1945

== From Islam ==
- Jean Mohamed Ben Abdeljlil, Moroccan Roman Catholic priest and a Catholic convert from Islam.
- Leo Africanus (c. 1494 – c. 1554?), Berber Andalusi Moorish diplomat and author who was converted to Christianity following his capture
- Bernard of Alzira (1135–1181), Andalusian prince and diplomat
- Juan Andrés, Spanish Islamic scholar who converted to Catholicism and wrote a well known polemical work against Islam, the Confusión o confutación de la secta mahomética y del Alcorán
- Juliana Awada (born 1974), Lebanese-Argentine businesswoman and First Lady of Argentina
- Adi Kurdi – Indonesia actor convert to Catholic.
- Josephine Bakhita (c. 1869–1947), Sudanese-Italian Canossian religious sister and Roman Catholic saint from Darfur, Sudan. She was forcibly converted to Islam. On 9 January 1890 Bakhita was baptised with the names of Josephine Margaret and Fortunata.
- Basuki Abdullah (1915–1993), Indonesian painter
- Bayano, also known as Ballano or Vaino, was an African enslaved by Spaniards who led the biggest slave revolts of 16th century in Panama
- Mohammed Christophe Bilek, Algerian former Muslim who lives in France since 1961; baptized Roman Catholic in 1970; in the 1990s, he founded Our Lady of Kabyle, a French website devoted to evangelisation among Muslims
- Francis Bok – Sudanese-American activist, convert to Islam from Christianity; but later returned to his Christian faith
- Jean-Bédel Bokassa (1921–1996), dictator of the Central African Republic and its successor state, the Central African Empire in what he became and declared Emperor (Bokassa was born Catholic Christian, converted himself to Sunni Islam for a year and a half, and came back to Catholic Christianity).
- Moussa Dadis Camara – ex-officer of the Guinean army who served as the President of the Republic of Guinea; Roman Catholic Christian convert from Islam
- Chehab family – prominent Lebanese noble family; having converted from Sunni Islam, the religion of his predecessors, was the first Maronite ruler of the Emirate of Mount Lebanon
- Djibril Cissé – French international footballer
- Hansen Clarke – U.S. Representative for Michigan's 13th congressional district
- Constantine the African – Baghdad-educated Muslim who died in 1087 as a Christian monk at Monte Cassino
- Casilda of Toledo (1007–1107), Muslim princess, the daughter of the ruler of Toledo.
- Justinus Darmojuwono (1914–1994), first Indonesian Cardinal of the Catholic Church; converted to Catholicism in 1932, served as Archbishop of Semarang from 1963 to 1981, and was elevated to the cardinalate in 1967
- Bob Denard, French soldier and mercenary. Born a Roman Catholic, Denard converted first to Judaism, then to Islam, and finally back to Catholicism again
- Dewi Rezer – Indonesian model of French descent
- Estevanico (c. 1500–1539), Berber originally from Morocco and one of the early explorers of the Southwestern United States
- Joseph Fadelle (born Mohammed al-Sayyid al-Moussawi in 1964), Roman Catholic convert from Islam and writer born in 1964 in Iraq to a Shiite family
- Rima Fakih (born 1985), Lebanese-American model, actress, professional wrestler and beauty pageant titleholder, Miss USA 2010, converted to the Maronite Church from Shia Islam upon marriage to her Maronite husband
- George XI of Kartli, Georgian monarch who ruled Eastern Georgia from 1676 to 1688 and again from 1703 to 1709; an Eastern Orthodox Christian, he converted to Islam prior to his appointment as governor of Qandahar; later converted to Roman Catholicism
- San Geronimo, a young Arab who had embraced Catholic Christianity, and had been baptized with the name of Geronimo
- Maria Hertogh, Dutch woman who had been raised by Muslims, then later returned to her Catholic biological parents
- Antuan Ilgit (born in 1972), Turkish-Italian Jesuit
- Sabatina James (born 1982), born in Dhedar, Pakistani-Austrian book author; started a new life in Vienna, changing her name and converting to Catholicism; baptized in 2006
- Lina Joy, Malay convert from Islam to Christianity; born Azlina Jailani in 1964 in Malaysia to Muslim parents of Javanese descent; converted at age 26; in 1998, she was baptized, and applied to have her conversion legally recognized by the Malaysian courts
- Don Juan of Persia (1560–1604), late 16th– and early 17th-century figure in Iran and Spain; also known as Faisal Nazary; was a native of Iran, who later moved westward; settled in Spain where he became a Roman Catholic
- Ilyas Khan – British philanthropist and businessman. Notable British Roman Catholic convert from Islam
- Ivan Krušala – writer, diplomat, explorer and a Catholic convert from Islam.
- Lakandula – Filipino ruler before Spanish conquest of Philippines
- Baldassare Diego Loyola (born Muhammad el-Attaz, 1631–1667) – Moroccan prince. He became a Jesuit priest and devoted himself to the evangelization of Muslims.
- Fernão Lopes (died 1545), 16th-century Portuguese soldier in India who converted to Roman Catholicism
- Enrique de Malaca – Malay slave of Ferdinand Magellan, converted to Roman Catholicism after being purchased in 1511
- Hubert Maga – former president of President of Dahomey
- Fadhma Aït Mansour – mother of French writers Jean Amrouche and Taos Amrouche
- Carlos Menem (born 1930), former Syrian-Argentinian President of Argentina; raised a Nusayri but converted to Roman Catholicism, a constitutional requirement for accessing the presidency until 1994
- Mizse – last Palatine of King Ladislaus IV of Hungary in 1290; born into a Muslim family in Tolna County in the Kingdom of Hungary; converted to Roman Catholicism
- Rajah Matanda – ruler of Maynila, a pre-Hispanic Tagalog polity along the Pasig River in what is now Manila, Philippines
- Archbishop Thomas Luke Msusa – born into a Muslim family; converted to Christianity as a child and later became an archbishop in his home country of Malawi, as well as converting and baptizing his father, a former imam
- Paul Mulla – Turkish scholar and professor of Islamic Studies at the Pontifical Oriental Institute
- Anthony Neyrot – Italian Dominican priest, apostate, reconvert, and martyr.
- Fata Omanović – Bosniak historical figure from Mostar, Bosnia and Herzegovina
- Domenico Ottomano (born Osman, 1642–1676) – alleged Ottoman prince and Dominican friar
- Karim Ouchikh – French lawyer and politician of Algerian (Kabylie) origin
- Malika Oufkir (born 1953), Berber-Moroccan writer and daughter of General Mohamed Oufkir; she and her siblings are converts from Islam to Catholicism; and she writes in her book, Stolen Lives, "we had rejected Islam, which had brought us nothing good, and opted for Catholicism instead"
- Shams Pahlavi (1917–1996), Princess of Iran and the elder sister of Mohammad Reza Pahlavi, Shah of Iran
- Sigi Wimala – Indonesian model and actress, converted to Catholicism after marriage with famous director, Timo Tjahtanto.
- Abdul Rahman – Afghan convert to Catholic Christianity who escaped the death penalty because of foreign pressure
- Rianti Cartwright – Indonesian actress, model, presenter and VJ; two weeks before departure to the United States to get married, she left the Muslim faith to become a baptized Catholic with the name Sophia Rianti Rhiannon Cartwright
- Nazli Sabri (1894–1978), Queen of Egypt, converted to the Catholic Church in 1950 and took the name "Mary Elizabeth"
- Begum Samru – Kashmir ruler of Sardhana, a small principality near Meerut.
- Lamin Sanneh – scholar of missions and religious studies
- Bashir Shihab II (1767–1850), Lebanese Emir of Mount Lebanon who ruled Lebanon in the first half of the 19th century; his family was Sunni Muslim; he and some members of his family converted to the Maronite Catholic Church at the end of the 18th century
- The Shihab family – prominent Lebanese noble family who originally belonged to Sunni Islam, and converted to Christianity at the end of the 18th century
- Mary Short (1802–1849), British-born Indian queen consort of Awadh, converted to Islam upon marriage, and converted to Catholicism when widowed.
- Skanderbeg (1405–1468), Albanian nobleman and military commander, was forcibly converted to Islam from Christianity, but reverted to Christianity later in life
- Rudolf Carl von Slatin – Anglo-Austrian soldier and administrator in the Sudan
- Albertus Soegijapranata – born in Surakarta, Dutch East Indies, to a Muslim courtier and his wife who later converted to Catholicism; the first native Indonesian bishop; known for his pro-nationalistic stance, often expressed as "100% Catholic, 100% Indonesian"
- Isabel de Solís – slave concubine and later the consort of Abu l-Hasan Ali, Sultan of Granada. After sultan's death, she converted to Roman Catholicism
- Maria Aurora von Spiegel (born Fatima) – Turkish mistress of Augustus II and the wife of a Polish noble
- Sophia Latjuba — Indonesian actress who converted to Catholicism from Anglicanism after previously converting to Anglicanism from Islam
- Tabaraji of Ternate – Indonesian sultan; converted to Roman Catholicism after 1534 and baptised with the name Dom Manuel
- Ismael Urbain – French journalist and interpreter.
- Francis Verney – English adventurer, soldier of fortune, and pirate. Converted to Catholicism shortly before his death
- Muley Xeque (Arabic: مولاي الشيخ Mawlay al-Shaykh, 1566–1621), Moroccan prince, born in Marrakech in 1566; exiled in Spain, he converted to Roman Catholicism in Madrid and was known as Philip of Africa or Philip of Austria
- Zaida of Seville – born an Iberian Muslim; when Seville fell to the Almoravids, she fled to the protection of Alfonso VI of Castile, becoming his mistress, converting to Christianity and taking the baptismal name of Isabel
- Zayd Abu Zayd (c. 1195–1265/1270), last Almohad governor of Valencia, Spain; remained a loyal ally of James I of Aragon; in 1236 he converted to Roman Catholicism, adopting the name of Vicente Bellvis, a fact which he kept secret until the fall of Valencia
- Saye Zerbo – President of the Republic of Upper Volta (now Burkina Faso)

== Former Catholics who had been converts ==
- Magdi Allam: converted in 2008, but left in 2013 to protest what he deemed its "globalism", "weakness", and "soft stance against Islam"
- Audrey Assad: American singer-songwriter and contemporary Christian music artist who converted from Evangelical Protestantism to Catholicism in 2007 but in 2021 announced that she was no longer a Catholic or Christian.
- Margaret Anna Cusack: Anglican nun who converted to Catholicism; founded The Sisters of St. Joseph of Peace, and later left due to conflict with a bishop; later became a critic of the Church's hierarchy and the Society of Jesus; her order survived in the Catholic Church
- Rod Dreher: writer and blogger; raised Methodist before converting to Catholicism; converted to Eastern Orthodoxy in 2006
- Henry Ford II: converted by Archbishop Fulton J. Sheen; twice divorced; later ceased practicing the faith, although he received the last rites of the Catholic Church on his deathbed; his funeral was Episcopalian
- Ernest Hemingway: Converted to marry his second wife, Pauline Pfeiffer. He subsequently divorced Pfeiffer and ceased practicing the faith. He received Catholic graveside services because his family requested it. Also, the fact that his death was a suicide was concealed initially. Ex-Catholics and people who committed suicide were not buried according to Catholic rites.
- Ammon Hennacy: Christian anarchist and activist who was Catholic from 1952 to 1965; his essay "On Leaving the Catholic Church" concerns his formal renunciation of the religion
- David Kirk: Baptist by upbringing; converted to the Melkite Greek Catholic Church in 1953 and became a Melkite priest in 1964; became Eastern Orthodox in 2004
- Otto Klemperer: German conductor. Converted to Catholicism, but returned to Judaism near the end of his life.
- Robert Lowell: United States Poet Laureate Consultant in Poetry who won the Pulitzer Prize for Poetry twice; left the faith by 1951
- Walter M. Miller, Jr.: author of A Canticle for Leibowitz; converted after his experiences in World War II; later renounced the faith
- Jean-Jacques Rousseau: Franco-Swiss philosopher, writer and political theorist who converted to Catholicism as a young man but later apostated to Calvinism in 1754
- Britney Spears: American singer, songwriter, dancer, and actress. Was raised Baptist before converting in 2021 but ceased believing in God by 2022

== See also ==
- Converts to Catholicism from Anglicanism
- Converts to Catholicism from atheism and agnosticism
- Converts to Catholicism from Judaism

Main articles

- Religious conversion
- Deathbed conversion
- Secondary conversion

Catholicism-related lists

- List of Roman Catholic Church artists
- List of Catholic authors
- List of Catholic philosophers and theologians
- List of former Catholics
