= The Price to Pay =

The Price to Pay may refer to:

- The Price to Pay (book), 2012 autobiography by Joseph Fadelle
- The Price to Pay (film), 2007 French comedy film
- The Price to Pay, 1996 TVB series
