= Schoeman =

Schoeman is a South African surname. Notable people with the surname include:

- Adri Schoeman (born 1970), retired South African sprinter, specialized in 400 metres
- Anriette Schoeman (born 1977), South African road cyclist
- Ben Schoeman (1905–1986), South African politician of the National Party prominent during the apartheid era
- Frank Schoeman (born 1975), South African former footballer
- Henri Schoeman (born 1991), South African triathlete
- Juan Schoeman (born 1991), South African rugby union player
- Karel Schoeman (1939–2017), South African novelist, historian, translator and man of letters
- Lizette Etsebeth-Schoeman (born 1963), South African former track and field athlete
- Marnus Schoeman (born 1989), South African rugby union footballer
- Paul Schoeman, South African rugby union player
- Pierre Schoeman (born 1994), South African rugby union player
- Renier Schoeman (rugby union) (born 1983), South African rugby union player
- Renier Schoeman (politician) (born 1944), South African politician
- Riaan Schoeman (born 1989), South African swimmer who specializes in the Individual Medley and Freestyle events
- Roland Schoeman OIS (born 1980), South African swimmer, member of the South African Olympic swimming team four times
- Roy H. Schoeman (born 1951), Jewish convert to Catholic Church, author.
- Stephanus Schoeman (1810–1890), State President of the South African Republic 1860 to 1862
- Tian Schoeman (born 1991) South African rugby union player

== See also ==
- Ben Schoeman Freeway, the main freeway between Johannesburg and Pretoria
- Jaftha v Schoeman, important case in South African law
- Schumann (disambiguation)
- Shuman (disambiguation)
