= Anjirō =

First recorded Japanese Christian

Anjirō (アンジロー) or Yajirō (弥次郎, ヤジロウ), baptized as Paulo de Santa Fé, was the first recorded Japanese Christian, who lived in the 16th century. After committing a murder in his home domain of Satsuma in southern Kyushu, he fled to Portuguese Malacca and he sought out Saint Francis Xavier (1506–1552) and returned to Japan with him as an interpreter. Along with Xavier, Anjirō returned to Japan with two other Jesuits, two Japanese companions, and a Chinese companion who had been baptized to Catholicism to form the first Jesuit mission to Japan.

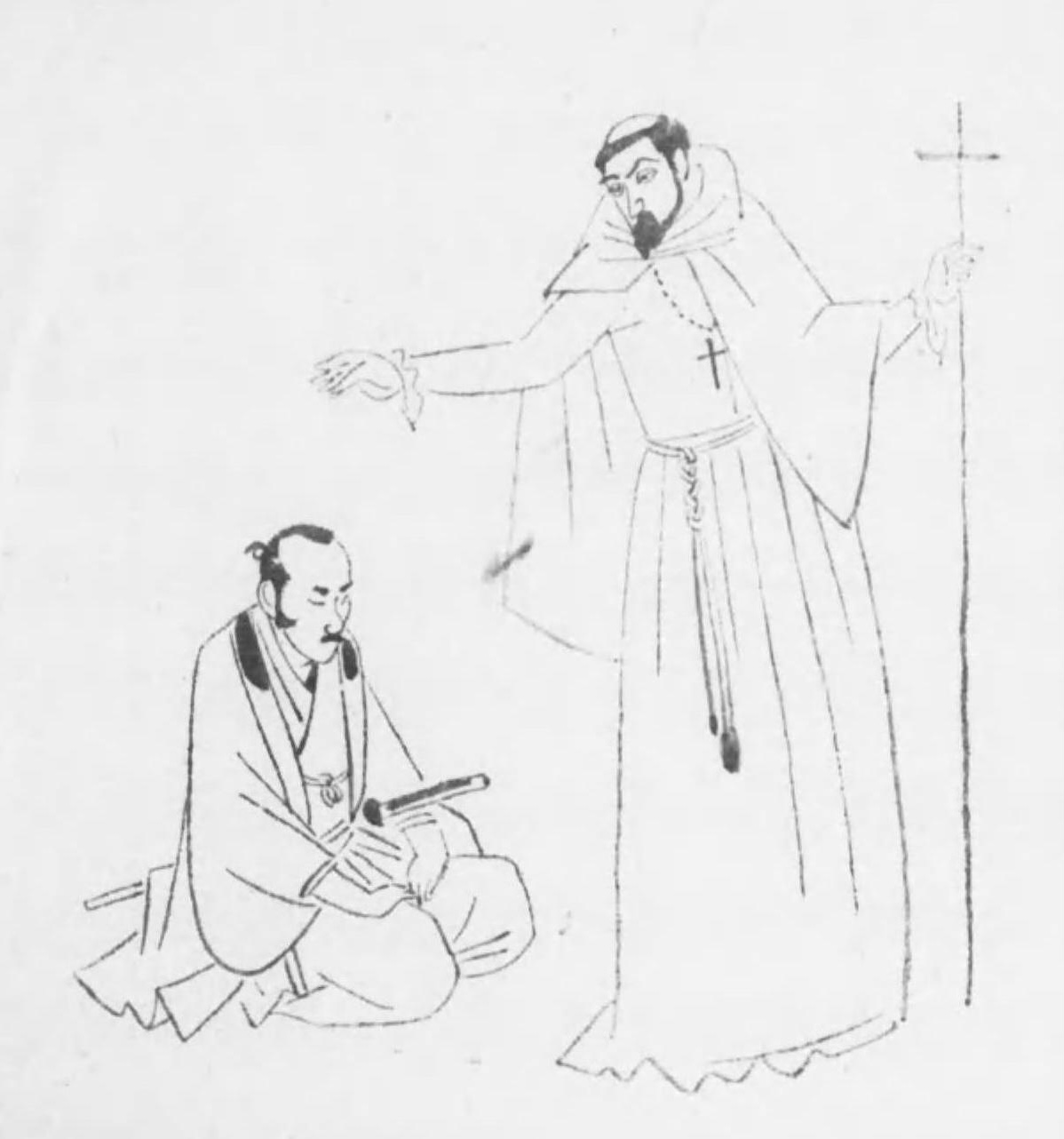
Anjirō and Saint Francis Xavier

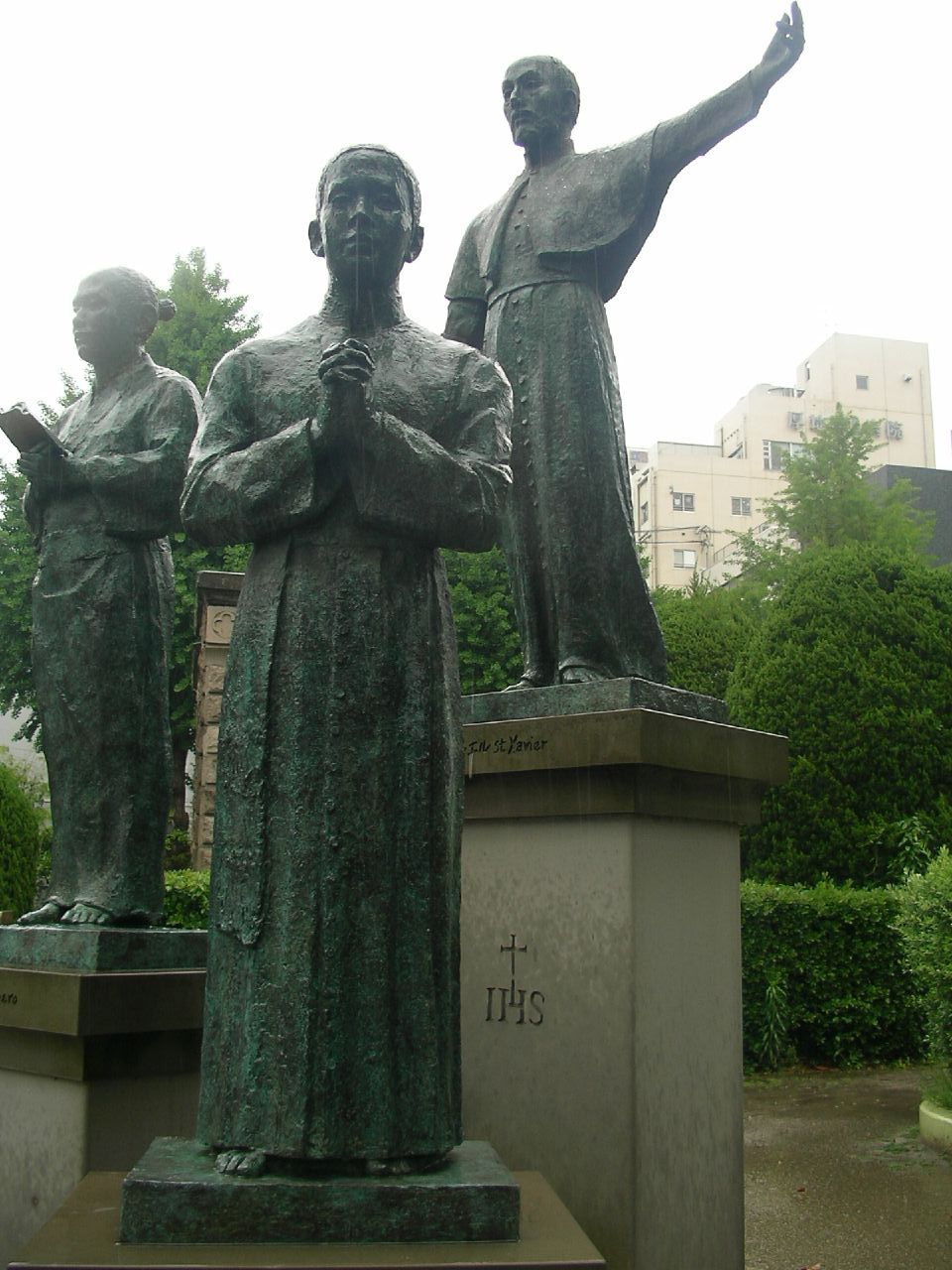
Statue of Francisco Xavier, Anjiro, and Bernardo the Japanese in Kagoshima

== Early life ==
Anjirō was originally a samurai of the Satsuma Domain, and was described to be "rich and of a noble extraction", but he killed a man and was forced to go on the run. In the port of Kagoshima, he met the Portuguese captain of a trading ship, Alvaro Vas, to whom he confessed his deed and described his hardships as an outlaw. Vas got him a job on a Portuguese ship, but Anjirō reported to the wrong ship and presented himself to Captain Jorge Álvares, a personal friend of Francis Xavier. Álvares took him to Malacca to see Xavier since he felt Xavier was better suited to hear Anjirō's confession. Upon their arrival, however, they had discovered that Xavier had departed for the Moluccas. Disappointed, Anjirō boarded a ship that would take him back to Japan, but it encountered a storm and had to take shelter on the Chinese coast. There, he met yet another Portuguese captain, who informed him that Xavier had returned to Malacca, and the captain took Anjirō back to Malacca, where he finally met Xavier in December 1547.

== With Xavier ==
Anjirō had picked up some rudimentary Portuguese by this time and could communicate with Xavier directly. The priest told Anjirō the word of God while Anjirō described the land of Japan to Xavier, which impressed the priest so much that he became resolved to go to Japan himself. Anjirō then went with Xavier to Goa, the headquarters of Portuguese India where he was baptized with the name Paulo de Santa Fé (Paul of the Holy Faith), furthered his training in the Portuguese language, and received catechesis in Saint Paul's College. On 14 April 1549, Xavier left Goa and made his way to Japan with a party of seven, including Anjirō as interpreter, and reached Malacca by 25 April. There, they boarded a Chinese pirate junk since that was the only craft they could book that would take them to Kagoshima.

=== Deus and Dainichi ===
The party landed in Kagoshima on August 15, 1549 and soon attracted attention as foreigners who came all the way from India, or Tenjiku, which was where the Japanese understood as the birthplace of Buddhism. Anjirō gathered crowds by vividly describing his experiences in India, and even the Satsuma daimyo Shimazu Takahisa became curious and sent for Anjirō and Xavier for an audience at his court. Xavier made a good impression on the young daimyo, who allowed his vassals to convert to Xavier's creed. At the time, the Japanese did not realize that Xavier was actually preaching a new religion different from Buddhism since he had come from India. The confusion was compounded by Anjirō's choice of using the term "Dainichi", the Japanese word for Vairocana Buddha, to refer to the Christian God since he mistakenly assumed that Japan had only one creator God. Xavier eventually realized the mistake in the summer of 1551 when he was preaching in Yamaguchi, far away from Satsuma. He used the Latin word "Deus" henceforth and denounced "Dainichi" as "an invention of the devil". The Buddhist monks, who initially respected Xavier, now resented him, forming an obstacle to the efforts of the Jesuits. Xavier acknowledged that Anjirō was uneducated in the written language (Classical Chinese) and so could not read well enough to give evidence about the religious affairs of his homeland.

Recently, the circumstances of Anjirō's translation have been complicated by scholars, including Jason Ānanda Josephson. Josephson notes that Anjirō's choice to translate Deus as Dainichi reflects earlier Shingon Buddhist means of coping with religious difference, with which Anjirō may have been familiar. Thus Anjirō's terminology may have represented an indigenous Japanese belief that "translation can bridge divergence."

== After Xavier ==
After less than a year in Kagoshima, Xavier went to Kyoto in hopes of converting the Emperor of Japan to Christianity so the whole nation would follow. He left Anjirō to lead the small congregation that they had managed to gather in Kagoshima. After Xavier returned from his unsuccessful endeavour in Kyoto, during which he realized both the Emperor of Japan and the Ashikaga shogun were powerless during the chaotic Sengoku period and their conversion would achieve nothing, he was recalled to Goa in 1552 and set his sights on China, dying on Shangchuan Island off its coast in the same year. After Xavier's departure from Japan, Anjirō's mission in Kagoshima became deserted in just two years, and Anjirō was driven out by religious persecution. He descended into piracy and died a wakō pirate on a raid in China.

== See also ==
- Camille de Soyécourt
- Exploration of Asia
