= Carmes Seminary =

University seminary in Paris, France

Coordinates: 48.8481°N 2.3297°E

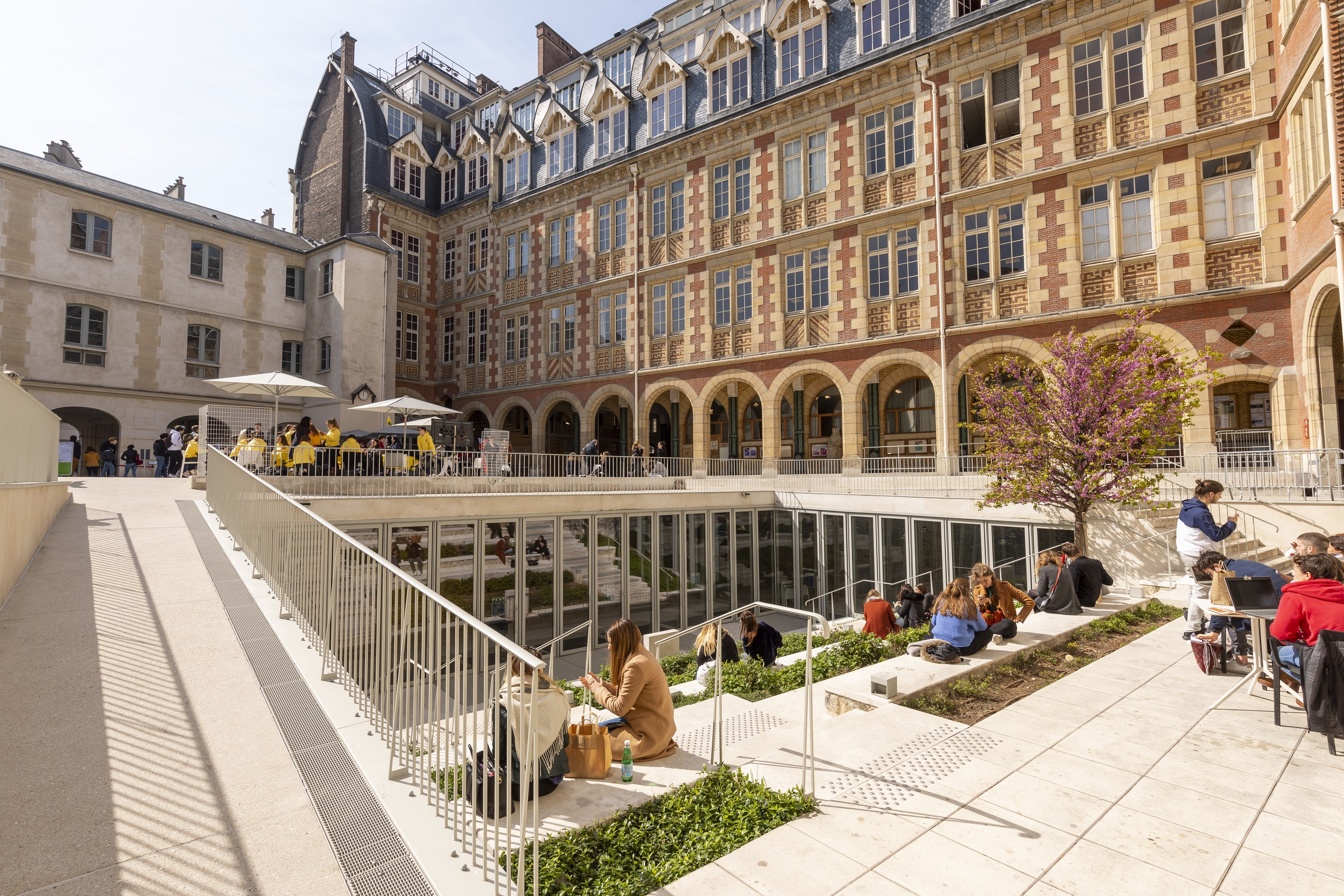
The Carmes Seminary

The Carmes Seminary (séminaire des Carmes) is a Catholic seminary within the Institut Catholique de Paris, in Paris, France. It was founded in 1919 and now houses more than fifty seminarians from several French dioceses.

== Monastery ==
It is sited at 21 rue d'Assas in the 6th arrondissement of Paris on the site of a former Discalced Carmelite monastery built in 1613. This monastery was the result of two Carmelite monks who were sent to Henry IV of France by Paul V in 1610. They only arrived in France shortly after Henry's assassination and Marie de Medici welcomed them and authorized them to set up a monastery not far from her court at the Palais du Luxembourg. They first set up a monastery in a house at the corner of rue Cassette and chemin de Vaugirard gifted to them by Nicolas Vivien, master of the accounts, but this soon proved too small and they soon moved to the rue d'Assas site, where they built a new chapel and monastery in 1613. This chapel was the first domed building in Paris. That monastery was taken over to become Carmes Prison during the French Revolution and was partially destroyed in the September Massacres.

After the worst of the upheavals had subsided, the wealthy heiress and Carmelite nun Camille de Soyécourt bought and restored the buildings of the seminary in a series of purchases starting on 8 August 1797. Having at first bought only a part of the buildings, she took advantage of an opportunity on 8 November 1801 to buy another part of the original Carmelite convent. She completed her acquisitions on 22 August 1807 by buying the third part of the buildings, thus obtaining a property far too important for the nuns' own needs. In 1819 she finished restoration of the portal of the church. Finally, on 23 July 1841, she gave the buildings unconditionally to Denis Auguste Affre, Archbishop of Paris. He used them for a new School of high ecclesiastical studies, the Institut Catholique de Paris, which was founded in 1875. The Carmelites did not leave the convent until 23 April 1845 to settle in the Avenue de Saxe in Paris, where mother Camille had built a new convent.

== Sources ==
- Clorivière, Pierre de; Cicé, Adélaïde de (1997), Lettres de prison, 1804-1806 (in French), vol. 2, Paris: Editions Beauchesne, ISBN 9782701013572
- Lecuit, Jean-Baptiste (2012), Le défi de l'intériorité : Le carmel réformé en France 1611-2011 (in French), Desclée De Brouwer, p. 288, ISBN 9782220080659
- "Renaissance du Carmel en France", Le Carmel en France (in French), carmel.asso.fr
- Séverin-Georges, Couneson (1970), Les Saints nos frères : calendrier pour chaque jour de l'année... (in French), Éditions Beauchesne
