= Schumann (disambiguation) =

Robert Schumann (1810–1856) was a German composer, music director and publisher of a trade paper.

Schumann or Schuman may also refer to:

- Schumann (surname), a surname and list of people with names Schumann or Schuman
- Shuman (surname), list of people with the name
- Schuman roundabout, an area of Brussels
  - Schuman railway station
- 4003 Schumann, an asteroid
- Robert Schuman University, named for French politician Robert Schuman
- Robert Schumann Hochschule, a university for music and media in Düsseldorf

== See also ==
- Neal-Schuman Publishers, an imprint of the American Library Association
- Robert Schuman Prize for European Unity
- Schoeman (surname)
- Schuman Declaration, Robert Schuman's appeal in 1950 to place French and German coal and steel industries under joint management
- Schumann Center for Media and Democracy, an American media-analysis organization
- Schumann resonances, peaks in the Earth's electromagnetic field spectrum, named for Winifred Otto Schumann
- Shuman (disambiguation)
