= Shuman =

Shuman may refer to:

== People ==
- Shuman (surname)
- Shuman Ghosemajumder, technologist, businessman

== Other ==
- The Shuman Company, literary management company
- Shuman Glacier, Antarctica
- Shūman, the nickname for Weekly Manga Times, a manga magazine in Japan

== See also ==
- Robert Schuman University, Strasbourg, France
- Schumann (disambiguation)
- Schoeman (surname)
- Shumann
