= Thomas Morton Harper =

English Jesuit priest, philosopher, theologian, and preacher

Thomas Morton Harper (26 September 1821 – 29 August 1893) was an English Jesuit priest, philosopher, theologian, and preacher.

Born in London of Anglican parents, his father being a merchant of good means in the city, he was educated first at St. Paul's School (London); then at Queen's College, Oxford. Having taken his B.A. degree, he subsequently received orders in the Anglican Church, in which he worked for five years as a curate. His first mission was in Barnstaple in Devon. Here he manifested High Church proclivities and took a vigorous part in ecclesiastical controversies in the local press. Getting into collision with his bishop on some points of doctrine, he left Devon and purchased a small proprietary chapel in a poor district in Pimlico, London. But his ritualistic views and practices here again brought him into conflict with his diocesan Charles James Blomfield, Bishop of London.

He was obviously drifting steadily towards the Catholic Church. The final impulse came from the perusal of an attack on the Jesuit Order in a volume entitled One Year in the Noviceship of the Society of Jesus by Andrew Steinmetz. He found the book unconvincing, and within half a year he converted to Catholicism, and some months later, in October 1852, he entered the Society of Jesus. He passed through his noviceship and philosophical studies in Belgium. His four years' theological course was divided between the English Jesuit Theological College, St. Beuno's in Wales, Rome, and Leuven. Ordained priest in 1859, he was appointed professor of theology the following year at St. Beuno's College. Two years later he was transferred to the chair of logic and general metaphysics at St. Mary's Hall, Stonyhurst. A man of highly-strung nervous disposition and intense mental application, his health made frequent changes necessary. He returned after a short time to teach theology at St. Beuno's and subsequently worked on the mission for some years, achieving a high reputation as a preacher. During the last half-dozen years of his life he suffered from prolonged attacks of mental prostration, the malady at times assuming an acute form.

== Publications ==
- Peace through the Truth, or Essays on Subjects connected with Dr. Pusey's Eirenicon, I (London, 1869), II (1874);
- The Metaphysics of the School, 3 vols. (London, 1879–1884).

In addition to these, he published several smaller works in booklet form. Amongst them were the following: "On Modern Principles"; "God the True the Good and the Beautiful"; "Manchester Dialogues"; "Lectures on Papal Infallibility". He also wrote a series of articles on John Henry Newman's Grammar of Assent, shortly after its appearance, though he did not esteem that book highly. His general approach was to anglicise scholastic terminology rather than to translate the concepts of the Schoolmen into the language of modern philosophical literature.
