= Mohammed Christophe Bilek =

Algerian writer

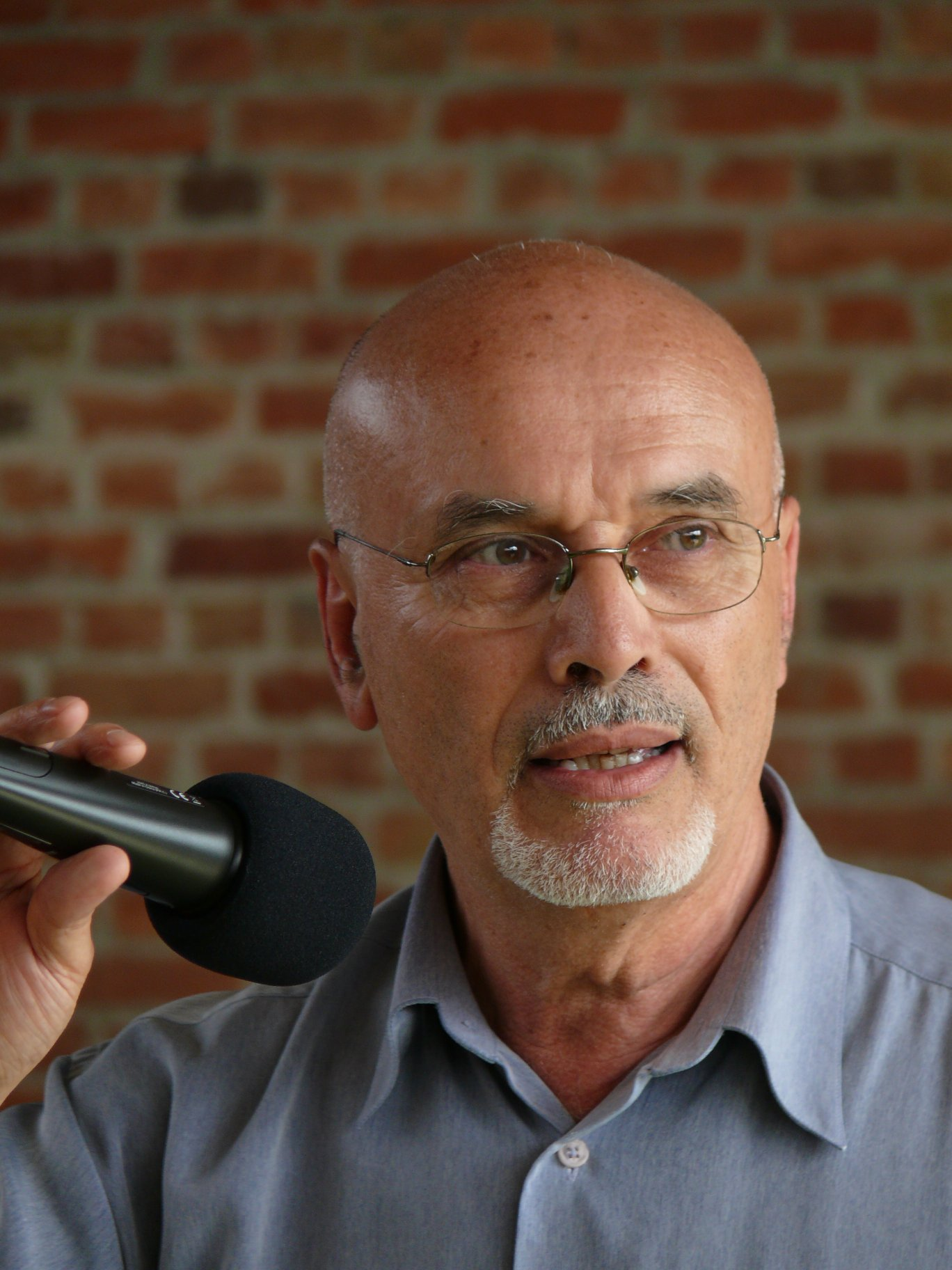
Moh-Christophe Bilek in 2014, during a conference entitled "Jesus the Messiah".

Mohammed Christophe Bilek or Moh-Christophe Bilek (born 1950) is an Algerian author and former Muslim who has lived in France since 1961.

Bilek was baptized in 1970, and since then has written two books: Un algérien pas Très Catholique (A not very Catholic Algerian), published by Éditions du Cerf (1999), and Saint Augustin Raconté à Ma Fille (Saint Augustine as told to my daughter), published by Éditions Qabel (2011). In the 1990s, he founded the Our Lady of Kabyle (in French), a website devoted to evangelization among Muslims and Muslim-Christian dialogue.

Bilek is a member of the Kabyle people.

== Works ==
- A Not Very Catholic Algerian, 1999
- Saint Augustine As Told to My Daughter, 2011
