= Joseph Fadelle =

Iraq convert to Catholicism

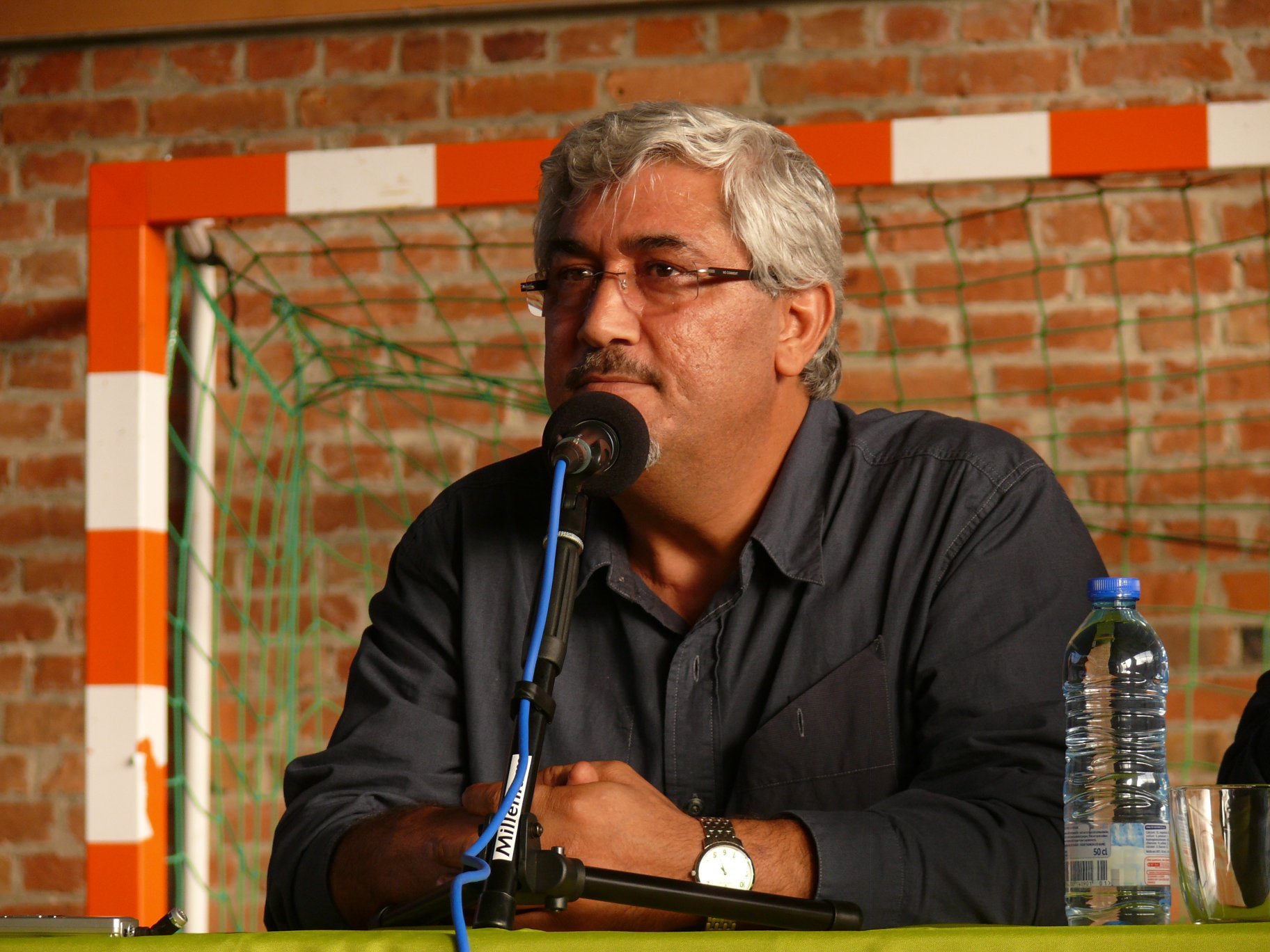
Joseph Fadelle in 2014.

Joseph Fadelle (born Mohammed al-Sayyid al-Moussawi - Arabic: محمد السيد الموسوي), is a Roman Catholic convert from Islam and a writer born in 1964 in Iraq in a Muslim Shiite family.

== Biography ==
Born in Iraq, in a relatively wealthy older aristocratic Shiite family of this country, Fadelle fled the country with his wife and children because of the fatwa after his conversion to Christianity. His conversion took place after a conversation with a Christian during his military service in 1987, alongside a dream and a strict reading of the Koran and the Bible. Joseph Fadelle went through a phase of atheism. He also had a dream that led him to embrace the Christian faith. He lived his conversion secret for many months, then he told his wife and she decided to follow her husband’s religion. He was discovered by his brothers who searched his bedroom and found a Bible, his brothers asked his son about what they did on Sundays and the little boy made the sign of the Cross. His family wanted to kill him. Tortured by the political regime of Saddam Hussein for several months at the request of a cousin, Fadelle was released only after his cousin died. He had to wait long to be baptized, as the Catholic authorities sought to avoid violating an Iraqi law banning proselytizing. Fadelle fled Iraq through Jordan, narrowly escaping an assassination attempt organised by his own brothers and uncle, and where a Muslim official of UNHCR (UN High Commissioner for Refugees) falsely accused Fadelle before Western authorities of complicity in the gas attack on Kurds which left 5,000 dead. Fadelle has lived in France since 2001 and has since obtained French citizenship.

In his autobiography, The Price to Pay, he describes his conversion, and refers to Muhammad as a political strategist, and not a religious man, and that Islam as a prison from which his conversion liberated him.

When traveling in public, Fadelle is escorted by police because of death threats.

In 2014, Fadelle prefaced Interroger l'Islam : 1235 questions à poser aux Musulmans !, authored by Guy Pagès.

== Bibliography ==
- The Price to Pay (autobiography), published on 25 March 2010, The Work Editions, ISBN 978-2-35631-060-6.
