= Joan Bartlett =

Catholic housing activist and foundress

- Born: August 1, 1911; Lancashire, England
- Died: September 9, 2002 (aged 91); London, England
- Occupation: Member of a Secular institute
- Known for: Founder of the Servite Secular Institute
- Awards: O.B.E., D.S.G.

Dame Joan Bartlett, S.S.I., O.B.E., D.S.G., (1 August 1911, Lancashire – 9 September 2002) was a prominent British convert to the Roman Catholic Church and the foundress of the Servite Secular Institute.

During World War II Bartlett worked in the European Broadcasting division of the BBC, and at night was a Commandant of the Red Cross.

In 1941, Bartlett converted to the Roman Catholic Church and became a tertiary of the Order of Servants of Mary. She opened a residential home for the elderly homeless, having been inspired by hearing Violet Markham speak at Caxton Hall about the plight of many elderly people who had been bombed out during The Blitz. Having already been accepted as a candidate to the Servite religious sisters, she was persuaded to delay her entry for this work by her spiritual director, a Servite friar.

The Servite Order lent Bartlett £8000 and the Air Raid Distress Fund of London another £3600 to help this project. With this money and other contributions from individual donors, most notably, Albert Oppenheimer (CBE) she purchased a property in The Boltons. It was registered as the Hearth and Home Housing Association, soon known as Servite Housing, and began to operate in 1946. They have since severed their connections with the institute she founded.

The following year the Holy See approved the formation of secular institutes under Canon law. This was a new form of consecrated life which would be lived by celibate people, some of them living in communities, other following independent lives in the world. Bartlett felt drawn to live in this way rather than in the religious congregation she had planned to join. She immediately began to draw up constitutions for the proposed institute.

The first gathering of other women drawn to this took place in 1952. Gradually the group established itself. In the 1960s connections were made with women in Germany and Italy who had a similar orientation in Servite spirituality. The institute received official approval in 1964 by the Roman Catholic Archdiocese of Westminster and they were formally incorporated into the Servite Order.

The institute continued to grow, being spread to other countries and received papal recognition in March 1979, at which time she was made a Dame in the Order of St. Gregory the Great by Pope John Paul II. The Constitutions of the Institute received final papal approval in February 1994. Members are now found in Argentina, Belgium, Canada, Colombia, France, Germany, Italy, South Africa, Spain and the United States of America, as well as in the United Kingdom.

Bartlett remained involved in Servite Housing until her death, having devoted the years since her retirement as Director to fund-raising. Independent Catholic News described her as follows: "Joan was a woman of vision, always ahead of her times, and as housing needs changed she went on to any number of imaginative housing projects."
