= Dilwyn Lewis =

British priest (1924–2000)

Monsignor Dilwyn Lewis (28 April 1924 – 10 July 2000) was a British clothes designer turned Roman Catholic priest who oversaw the restoration of the ancient Basilica di Santa Maria Maggiore in Rome.

== Biography ==
Raised in an orphanage, Bridgend Cottage Homes, in his birth town of Bridgend in Wales, Dilwyn John David Lewis studied for the ministry in the Church of England at Kelham College but instead became a clothing salesman before embarking on a successful career as a freelance clothing designer in London. Cardinal Montini, the future Pope Paul VI, suggested Lewis join the priesthood in 1960, but it was 1974 before Lewis was ordained at Arundel Cathedral. When Lewis received Pope John Paul II on his arrival at Gatwick Airport, where Lewis was chaplain, in 1982, he caught the attention of Archbishop Bruno Heim and Cardinal Basil Hume, who saw to it that in 1984 he was posted as a canon of the Basilica di Santa Maria Maggiore in Rome.

Working under Cardinal Luigi Dadaglio, archpriest of the Basilica, Lewis was appointed Vicar Capitular by John Paul II and put in charge of the administration and restoration of the Basilica, which was in an alarmingly poor state of repair and threatened with financial ruin after years of mismanagement. Lewis raised funds for the repair bill, estimated at more than £9,000,000.

In addition to assisting with restoration, Lewis organised musical performances and special events at the Basilica and coordinated collaborations with the Church of England, including arranging for the loan of St. Thomas Becket's yellow silk dalmatic to the Canterbury Cathedral and for the celebration in the Basilica of the Eucharist by Anglican priests.

Dilwyn Lewis was buried in the crypt of Basilica di Santa Maria Maggiore following his death in Ireland in 2000.

== Commemoration ==
In July 2022 a blue plaque was unveiled in his honour at St. Marys Bridgend, where he had donated many hundreds of pounds and the Allen organ, and remembered via an engraving of his coat of arms on one of the windows in the Narthex.
