= Göran Stenius =

Swedish Finnish journalist, official in the Foreign Ministry and writer

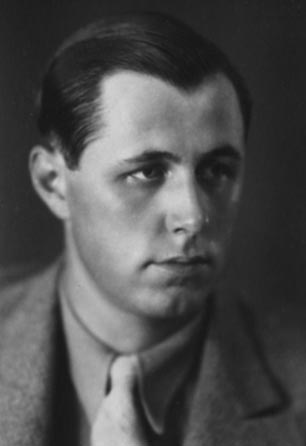
Göran Stenius.

Göran Erik Stenius (9 July 1909, Viipuri – 21 June 2000, Helsinki) was a Swedish Finnish journalist, official in the Foreign Ministry and writer. His parents were Einar Stenius, a Councillor of the Court of Appeal, and Sigrid Helena Thome. In 1938, he married Lisbeth Astrid Maria Grotenfelt.

Stenius completed his secondary education (matriculation examination) at Wiborgs svenska lyceum in 1927 and graduated from the University of Helsinki with a Master of Philosophy degree in 1935. As a journalist, he worked from 1933 to 1941 and was employed by the Information Center of the Council of State from 1940 to 1941 and was the Information Center's Representative in Stockholm from 1941 to 1942.

During his service in the Ministry for Foreign Affairs, Stenius was an official at the Finnish legation to the Holy See from 1942 to 1951, serving as Chargé d'Affaires from 1947 to 1951, a Secretary at the Ministry from 1951 to 1965, Head of Division in 1965 and Counselor at the Finnish Embassy inin London from 1969 to 1973. Stenius was granted the title of professor in 1995. He was also the recipient of several literary prizes, including the Swedish Literature Society in Finland prize in 1935, the State Prize for Literature in 1955, the Helsinki City prize in 1956, the Tollander Prize in 1956, and the Lybeck Prize in 1975.

Stenius books are mainly about Karelia. The book Femte Akten, published in 1937, tells about Olavi Paavolainen’s visit to Nazi Germany with Stenius. Klockorna i Rom (1955) was an international success. From 1957, Stenius served on the board of the Finland-Swedish Writers' Association (Finlands svenska författareförening).

Stenius was a convert to Catholicism.

== Works ==
- Det okända helgonets kloster (1934)
- Femte akten (1937)
- Fiskens tecken (1940)
- Hungergropen (1944)
- Fästningen (1945)
- Vatikanen (1947) (non-fiction)
- Klockorna i Rom (1955)
- Avhopparen (1957)
- Brödet och stenarna (1959)
- Från Rom till Rom (1963) (non-fiction)
- Finlandia. Silhuett i Öster (1967) (text by Stenius)
- Den romerska komedin (1967)
- Bronspojken från Ostia (1974)
- Editor for Finnland. Geschichte und Gegenwart (1961)
