= Camille de Soyécourt =

French Carmelite nun

Servant of God Thérèse Camille of the Child Jesus OCD
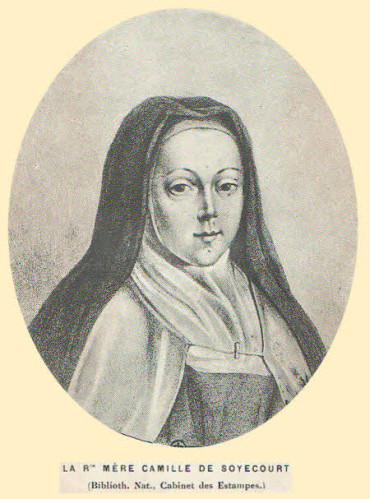
- Born: Camille de Soyécourt; 25 June 1757; Paris, France
- Died: 9 May 1849 (aged 91); Paris

Camille de Soyécourt (1757–1849) or Thérèse Camille de l'Enfant-Jésus was a French Discalced Carmelite nun who restored the order in France after the French Revolution.

Camille de Soyécourt was the daughter of the Marquis de Soyécourt. As a child she was placed with the nuns of the Order of the Visitation of Holy Mary. At the age of 16 Camille decided to become a nun but faced opposition from her parents who wanted her to marry, which she strongly opposed. She waited until her majority at the age of 25 to enter the Carmelites, much to the despair of her parents. At the start she found the austere life difficult.

During the French Revolution the nuns were expelled from their convent in 1792. They settled in small groups in apartments and continued their conventual life. Several were arrested, including Sister Thérèse Camille, who was released after some time in prison. After a period of wandering she returned to Paris and founded a clandestine religious community.

In 1796, since all her family had died during the Revolution, she inherited the family property and began to fund various actions to support the clergy and the nuns who were leaving prison or who were in misery. In 1797, she bought the Carmes Convent buildings and set up an unauthorised convent that became the hub of all French Carmelite convents.

Because she supported Pope Pius VII and the "black cardinals", Mother Thérèse Camille was exiled to Guise by Napoleon from 1811 to 1813. After returning to Paris she continued her work of restoring the Carmelite order while also supporting the clergy and other religious communities. In 1845 she sold the Carmes Convent to the archbishop of Paris to house a school of high ecclesiastical studies and settled with her nuns in a new convent established especially for them. She died on 9 May 1849 at the age of 91. Her beatification process began in 1938.

== Biography ==
Arms of the Soyécourt family

=== Childhood and family ===
Camille de Soyécourt came from the Picardy nobility of Ancien Régime. She was born in Paris on 25 June 1757, third daughter of Joachim Charles de Seigliere de Belleforiere, Marquis de Soyécourt and Marie-Sylvine de Berengar-Sassenage. She was nicknamed "Mademoiselle-de-Trop" ("Miss Too Much") by one of her aunts, since her father already had two daughters and badly wanted a son to succeed him. Her father was the colonel of a Dragoon regiment and took part in the Seven Years' War. He left the army at the age of 36 to look after his domains, where he was popular.

Camille de Soyécourt was baptized at the Church of Saint-Sulpice, Paris, the day after her birth. Her father, who wished to stay close to her, gave her a governess and a tutor for her early education.

In 1766 she was placed for four years at a convent of the Visitandines, whose superior was Madame de Brancas, to complete her academic and religious education. There she found her two older sisters, who had entered the convent when very young. In the convent the staff said she was a good student, "full of virtues" and very pious. However, her father, wishing to see her more freely than when she was behind the gates of the convent, moved her to a Benedictine convent that had already accepted his mother. She left this convent and after some time entered the Benedictine Tresnel Abbey on the Rue de Charonne.

=== Marriage versus convent ===
Camille took her First Communion "with great devotion" at the age of 15 on 25 December 1772. When she was sixteen her parents wanted to marry her to a nobleman much older than her. If she wanted to be a nun rather than get married, she did not find the courage to tell her parents. She even planned to wait for her widowhood to enter the convent. However, her future husband died before the wedding, which she understood as "a sign of God calling her to the convent". She then declared her desire to become a nun to her parents, but they sharply refused her request, despite being very religious. The girl then stated that she would wait for her majority at the age of 25.

Camille alternated between periods at the convent of the Benedictine nuns and months spent at her family home. She took the opportunity to establish a regular correspondence with the nuns of the Visitation with whom she had formed a tender friendship. With her mother and her brother she made a trip to Dauphiné, visiting Savoie and Chambéry. When she returned her parents offered her a new wedding project. She again refused, but her parents made her leave her convent. She returned to the family home where she adapted to social life and gradually began to enjoy it. She also gradually abandoned prayer, starting to hesitate between marriage and the convent.

At 22 she took a spiritual director who led her back to prayer. At the end of the year 1780, during a retreat in a Benedictine convent, she tried to stay in the convent but his mother collected her and forced her back to the family home. Confirmed in her intention to wait until she reached the age of 25 and then return to the convent, she wondered about which order she should join. His confessor told her of the Carmelites, and after a visit to the convent on the Rue de Grenelle, she was convinced that her place was here. Her parents and family were worried when they heard she wanted to enter the austere and difficult Carmelite order, and tried to dissuade her. They even tried to push her to enter the convent of the Visitation where she still had friends and which offered a more comfortable life including family visits. The young Camille was tempted, but finally used a subterfuge to enter the Carmelite convent on 2 February 1784, to the despair of her parents.

=== Carmelite ===
The first months of her adaptation to the very austere life of the convent were difficult. Coming from a noble family, she was not accustomed to physical discomfort. She should have made her vows three months after entering the convent, but her family demanded a six-month delay in the hope that she would give up her project during this period.

She took the religious name Thérèse Camille de l'Enfant-Jésus at her investiture on 24 July 1784. (Note: At the time the nuns were divided into the professed sisters, who prayed, and the lay sisters, who were more involved in manual work.) Among the many people that attended her final entry into the Carmelite convent was the future King Louis-Philippe, who was very struck by the celebration. After a year of novitiate Sister Camille pronounced her vows on 31 July 1785. Her parents made a last attempt to divert her from her project before this fateful date and made several requests to the Archbishop of Paris to examine the validity of their daughter's understanding of the step, but without success.

Madame Louise de France, Carmelite at Compiègne, had asked Camille's superior to not spare her. The first two winters were particularly harsh, and manual labor was difficult for Sister Térèse-Camille, but her good will offset her physical weaknesses.

=== Revolution and prison ===
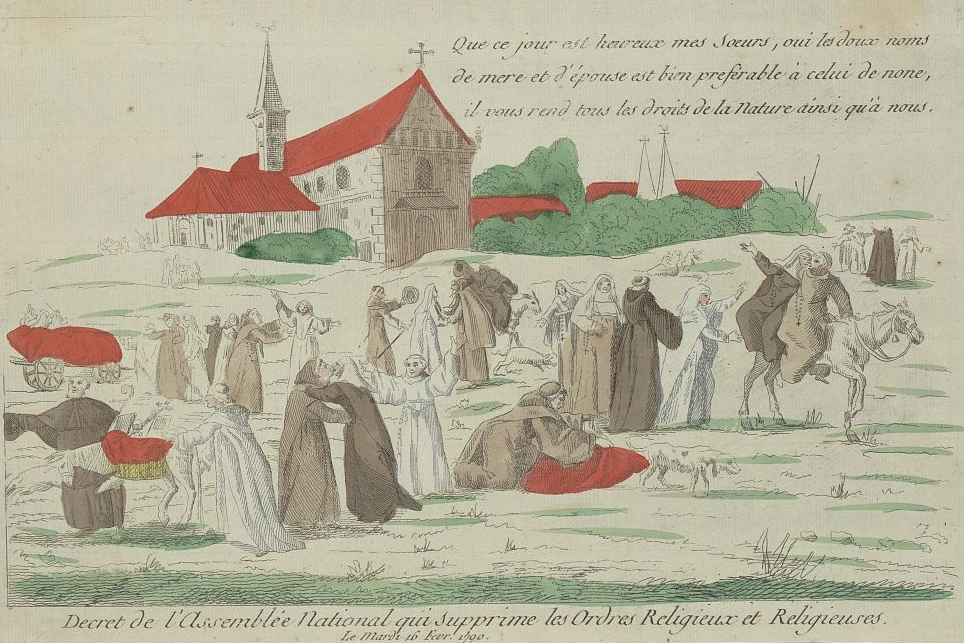
Cartoon of the Decree of the National Assembly suppressing religious orders on 16 February 1790

A law of 1789 abolished monastic vows in France. In 1790 the Civil Constitution of the Clergy suppressed religious bodies and was supposed to empty all convents. The Carmelites of Paris addressed a petition to the National Constituent Assembly on behalf of all their order and obtained permission to preserve their buildings and their community life. The respite was short-lived. On 2 September 1792, when the first massacres of monks and clergy in the prisons had already begun, five men tried to force the door of their convent. On 14 September 1792 two commissaries of the commune of Paris opened the doors of the convent and went through the building collecting and plundering all the precious objects. They then expelled the Carmelites before allowing the population to enter.

The convent's superior, Mother Nathalie, had sensed the change in the revolutionary wind and had prepared for expulsion. She had provided civilian clothes to the nuns and prepared small homes where the 31 Carmelites lived in groups of five or six nuns. The nuns continued their life of contemplation and prayer. They received priests and bishops to celebrate masses, and hid them and supported them during the persecutions. Many nuns were arrested, imprisoned and even sentenced to death, but after months or years of imprisonment all escaped the guillotine.

Despite her parents' asking her to return to the family estate, Sister Thérèse Camille remained in the house on Rue Mouffetard in Paris that had been allotted to her and other Carmelites. Spotted by a revolutionary guard, a troop tried to surprise them in high mass, but failed since there was no mass that day. The house was searched and then was closed on Good Friday, 29 March 1793. Sister Thérèse Camille was subject to several interrogations and was detained in Sainte-Pélagie Prison. Her parents tried to free her without success. Finally, since there was no specific charge against her, the courts released her on the day of Pentecost. The respite was brief. After eight months her parents were arrested and imprisoned, her father in Carmes Prison and her mother in Sainte-Pélagie Prison.

Sister Camille remained free, fled and lived through a period of great misery. She was called to seal the family home after the death of her mother on 25 March 1794, then returned to Paris and went to her parents' mansion, where she feared being arrested in turn. Left free, she stayed there and tried without success to see her father, who was still imprisoned. She did manage to exchange some letters with him. After much effort and the help of servants Sister Camille went to Carmes Prison and was able to see her father for a short interview. Her father and her sister Catherine, the Countess Hinnisdal, were guillotined during the Reign of Terror on 23–24 July 1794.

When the Decree of Exile of the Nobles was published in 1794, Sister Thérèse Camille took refuge at her parents' estate at Moulineaux near Paris. She took in the son of her sister, the Countess of Hinnisdal. (Note: Mother Thérèse Camille become the tutor of her young nephew, and maintained very affectionate links after his marriage and with his children.) She took charge and developed the estate.

=== Carmelite restoration in France ===
The Reign of Terror ended with the death of Maximilien Robespierre on 28 July 1794. Sister Thérèse Camille applied for permission to return to Paris, which was granted on 15 October 1794. She rented a house on Rue des Postes near the seminary church. The following year, she rented a larger house on the Rue Saint-Jacques where she set up a small improvised convent that became home to many nuns coming out of prison, and also accommodated several ecclesiastics who were passing or in distress.

A decree published in 1796 authorized nobles who had not fled France during the revolution and the Terror to recover their property. Sister Thérèse Camille was the heiress of her family, but hesitated to take steps that seemed contrary to her vow of poverty. Pope Pius VI urged her to demand the return of family property and even made it a duty to preserve it. The pope authorized her to do so by a brief of July 1797. The situation was surprising enough at the time for some to speak jokingly of the "Carmelite millions".

==== Carmelite convent ====
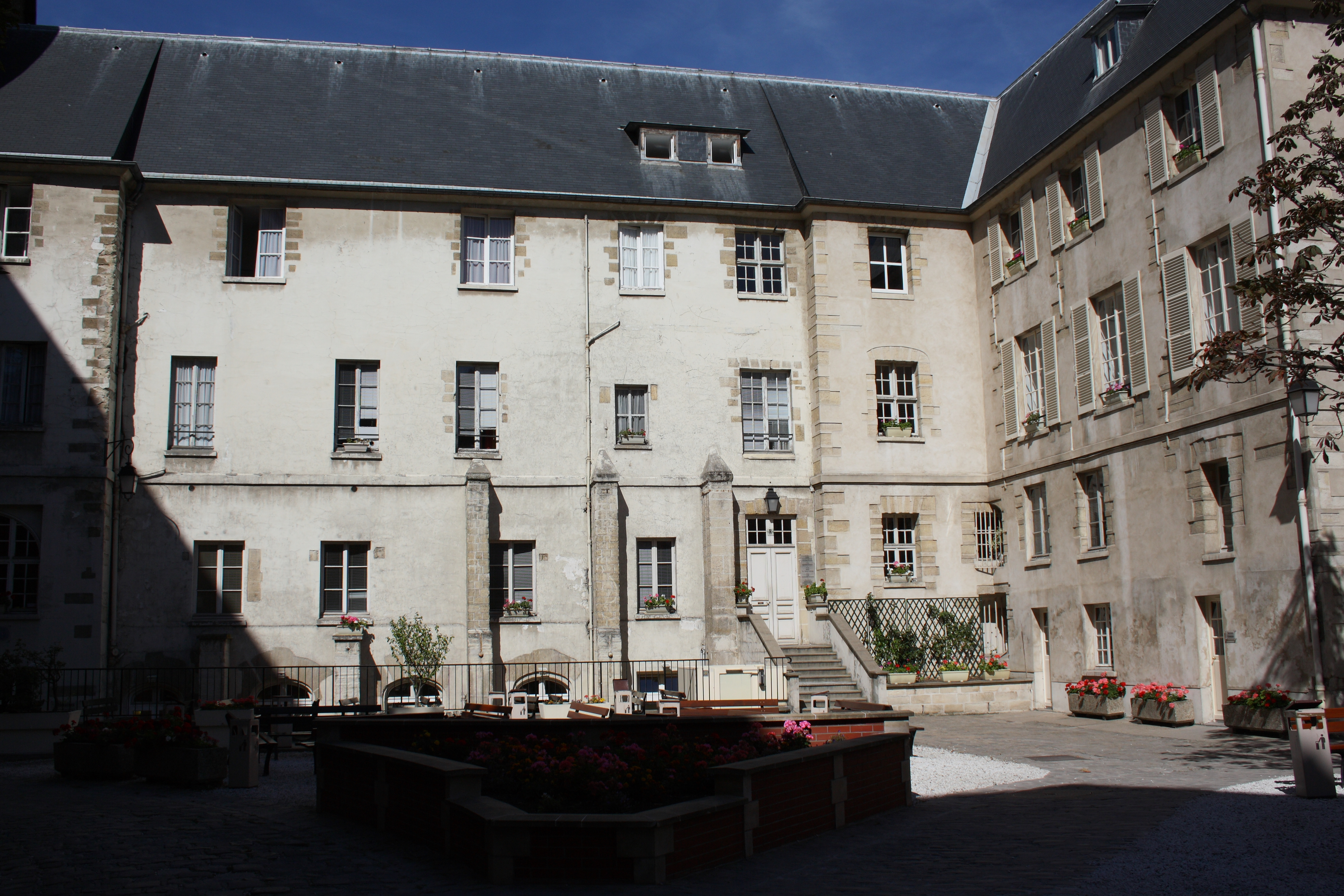
View of part of the Carmelite Convent, today the Institut Catholique de Paris

On 8 August 1797 Mother Thérèse Camille de l'Enfant-Jésus redeemed some of the buildings of the Carmes convent in the Rue Vaugirard. This saved the building from destruction. (Note: The plank merchant who had bought the building planned to destroy it to sell the materials, which would let him repay the loans he had contracted for his purchase. At first Mother Thérèse Camille planned to restore the building to the Carmelite brothers, but the political situation at the time did not make their return practical. They would not be able to settle in France until about 1840.) She launched major works to restore the buildings, which had been badly damaged and had no doors or windows, with rubble everywhere. Later her hagiographers would say that the bloodstains of the victims of the Carmes Prison were still visible on the walls.

The church and some residential buildings were the first targets of the works. On 24 August 1797 the first mass was celebrated in the chapel of St. Joseph. On 29 August the convent's church could be used again and was officially blessed by the Bishop of Saint-Papoul in a rich ceremony. She also had a "chapel of martyrs" built and restored in memory of the massacre of 2 September 1792 that took place in the former prison. The nuns even collected some vestiges that they kept as relics. A dozen Carmelites settled in the improvised convent.

Mother Thérèse Camille chose for her cell the room which had served as a prison for her father a few years earlier. She would stay there for nearly fifty years until the doctor obliged her to move to the infirmary and to take a better bed because of the state of her health. The prioress of the convent having died, the sub-prioress Mother Sophie of Saint Jean-Baptiste was designated prioress. Two years later Mother Thérèse Camille was elected by the chapter as prioress of the convent.

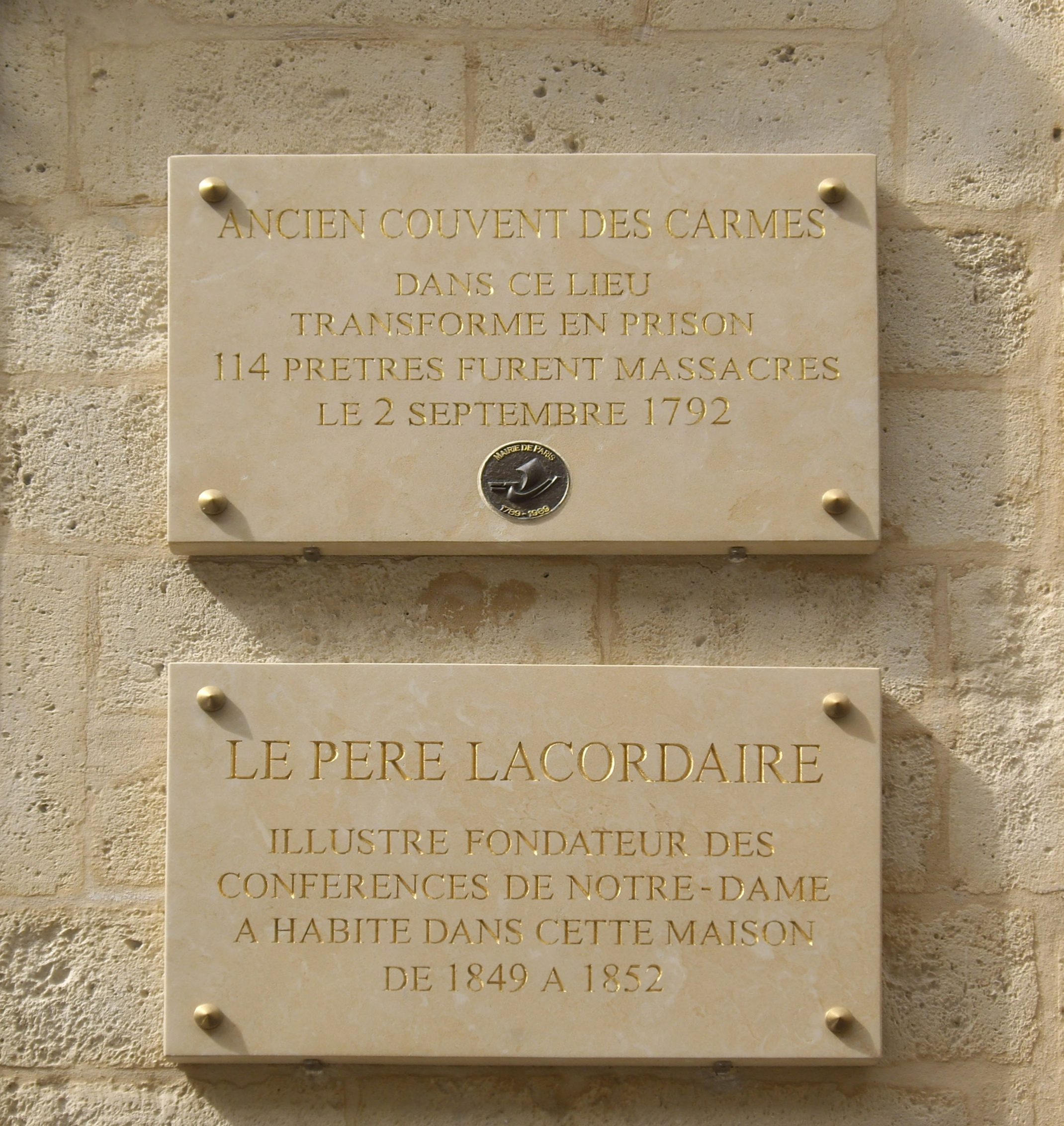
Memorial plaque in memory of the September Massacres

From this moment the monastery becomes a hub for all the French Carmelites. It welcomed and gathered the Carmelite nuns scattered by the revolution, whether formerly from this convent, from other convents, or who had taken shelter in convents abroad. Mother Thérèse Camille sent them back in groups to rebuild communities destroyed during Revolution. However, although well known to the public, the convent was still not authorized by the government. The nuns dressed in civilian clothes and wore their Carmelite attire only on very rare occasions. Mother Thérèse Camille and her nuns were under the constant threat of an administrative closure of their convent and dispersion of the community. This did not prevent them from continuing their activities.

Mother Thérèse Camille continued to restore and refurbish the convent church, going as far as to claim or buy back looted paintings and sculptures and to put them back in their place. On several occasions the government tried to take back possession of the church. Mother Thérèse Camille firmly, calmly and successfully opposed them. Having at first bought only a part of the buildings, she took advantage of an opportunity on 8 November 1801 to buy another part of the original Carmelite convent. She completed her acquisitions on 22 August 1807 by buying the third part of the buildings, thus obtaining a property far too large for the nuns' needs. In 1819 she finished restoration of the portal of the church. Finally, on 23 July 1841, she gave the buildings unconditionally to Denis Auguste Affre, Archbishop of Paris. He would use them for a new School of high ecclesiastical studies, today the Institut Catholique de Paris. The Carmelites did not leave the convent until 23 April 1845 to settle in the Avenue de Saxe in Paris, where Mother Thérèse Camille had built a new convent.

==== Other convents ====
Mother Thérèse Camille also used her fortune to buy and restore other monasteries seized and sold by the State during the French Revolution, or even to create new convents for the nuns of her order, and also of other monastic orders. Thus, she participated actively in the restoration of the monasteries of Paris, Bourges, Pontoise and Trévoux. She continued her work under the Bourbon Restoration and the July Monarchy. From 1835 she tried but failed to rebuild a Carmelite convent in Compiègne (that convent was established in 1872).

The activity of Mother Thérèse Camille in restoration of the Carmelite Order in France was so decisive that some authors do not hesitate to declare that she was "the soul of the restoration of Carmel in France". Others more soberly say she restored Carmel in France after its disappearance during the Revolution. About sixty Carmelite convents were reopened in France during her lifetime, almost all with her support. (Note: Sur les 74 fermés à la Révolution)

==== Aid to the clergy ====
Living in the Carmelite convent and disposing of her fortune, Mother Thérèse Camille continued to house priests in difficulty, even to finance their installation in their parish, providing them with liturgical equipment and clothing to restore churches to service that had been looted during the revolutionary troubles. She also welcomed indigent priests returning from exile or leaving prison. She financed the seminary of the Holy Spirit and helped the parish of Saint-Sulpice of Paris. Her assistance also extended to many religious institutes and to pious works. Her hagiographers indicate that Mother Thérèse Camille had a great sense of organization and that her initiatives were innumerable.

=== Opposition to the Emperor ===
During the First French Empire under Napoleon Mother Thérèse Camille became a member of the French ultramontane movement. She considered that the Catholic religion must be headed by the pope in Rome and not by the government in Paris. During the occupation of the Papal States by the French army in 1809 and the excommunication of Napoleon, Mother Thérèse Camille was a faithful support of Pope Pius VII and the exiled Cardinals. She spread the text of the papal bull of excommunication, accommodated the expelled cardinals and provided them with subsidies when Napoleon cut off funding and exiled them. She also ensured liaison between Pope Pius VII, prisoner of Napoleon, and the "black cardinals". (Note: In response to church's opposition to him Napoleon had the purple stripped from the cardinals. Hence the name of black cardinals.)

Her opposition was not without risk. Since her convent was not officially authorized the political authorities could close it at any time and disperse this "illegal gathering of nuns". A Vatican courier intercepted by the police revealed to the authorities Mother Thérèse Camille's role in supporting the pope and his cardinals. She was immediately arrested and then exiled to Guise from 1811 to 1813. The exile was difficult for her, even though many people gave her support because of the affection that the local population had for her family. Although exiled, Mother Thérèse Camille returned incognito to Paris to settle some important business. While staying in the Carmelite convent, in disguise and without the knowledge of the nuns, she was recognized and created a great stir among the nuns, happy to find their mother. She had to leave Paris in disguise to avoid being taken by the police. Her health was deteriorating.

The mayor of Guise obtained the end of her exile and her return to Paris for health reasons. Napoleon, who had exiled her, admired Mother Thérèse Camille in spite of everything. He said of her that if all his supporters had the fidelity of this woman for the causes she supported, he would not have so much trouble. Upon her release, the emperor allowed her to enclose her convent, and let the nuns wear their religious habit within its walls. (Note: Until this time the convent was not surrounded by a closed wall, contrary to the Carmelite rule. The nuns did not wear the Carmelite habit for the sake of discretion and because of the lack of a wall.) On her return to Paris she was given a warm reception by the "black cardinals" and Pope Pius VII.

=== At the end of a busy life ===
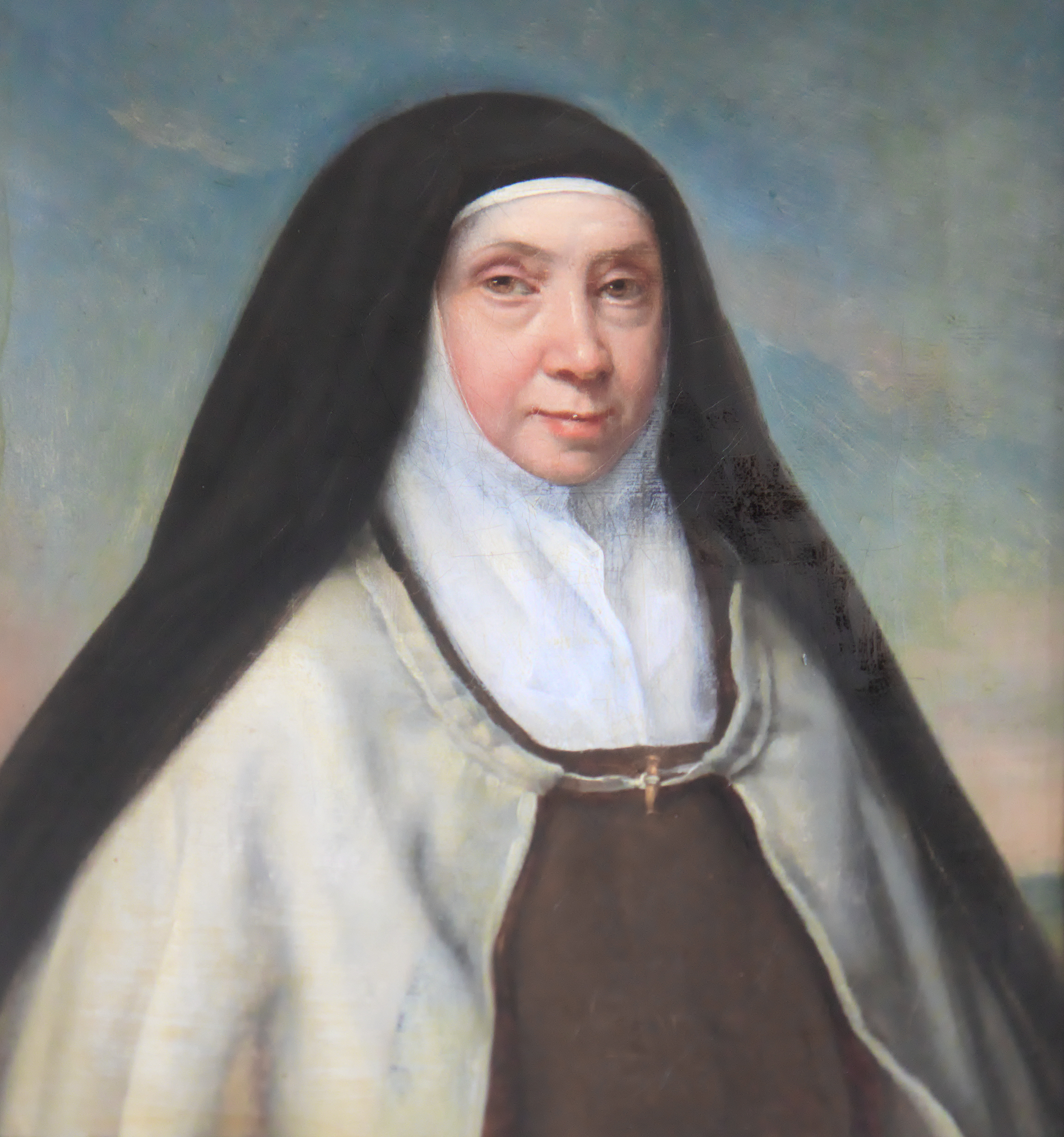
Camille de Soyécourt towards the end of her life

After having been elected prioress of the convent several times, Mother Thérèse Camille had to transfer the load to another nun. (Note: The Carmelite rule provides that a prioress can not have more than two successive terms of three years.) Finding no other qualified nun, the Carmelites wrote to the Pope asking him to keep Mother Thérèse Camille as prioress of the convent for life. Pope Pius VII granted this, and his successor Pope Leo XII confirmed the decision.

Mother Thérèse Camille, seeing that she could not use all her fortune, donated it to her family, retaining only some life annuities to meet her financial commitments. At this time she also decided to leave the Carmelite convent in Paris, since she knew the Carmelite community could not manage the maintenance and the expense after her death. Mother Thérèse Camille, at the age of 84, left the convent with the Carmelites on 23 April 1845 and settled in the Avenue de Saxe in Paris in a new convent built for them by Mother Thérèse Camille. (Note: Other sources say the nuns moved to the Bernardine convent on Rue Vaugirard.)

Mother Thérèse Camille became increasingly deaf. For a while she compensated for her disability by lip reading, but her failing vision prevented her from continuing this technique. Becoming progressively infirm, she was confined to the infirmary bed where the nuns took turns to keep her company. Suffering from various ailments, she kept her good mood and her memory, telling stories to her companions to pass the time. Despite the sickness and weakness of her constitution, she continued fasting during Lent and other days proscribed by the Church. Her health was affected by several falls, and she was treated by bleeding and the use of medicinal leeches.

Mother Thérèse Camille died on 9 May 1849 at the age of 91, having experienced and survived the 1789 revolution, the July Revolution of 1830 and the French Revolution of 1848. Her body lay in state in the choir of the church. Witnesses said it looked like that of a person in their fifties sleeping gently. She was buried at her request in the crypt of the martyrs in the Carmelite convent of Paris. Her gravestone is visible.

A cause was opened for Camille's beatification, and she was granted the title of Servant of God. Her spiritual writings were approved by theologians on 20 November 1940.

== Spirituality ==
Mother Thérèse Camille de l'Enfant-Jésus was very devoted to Mary, mother of Jesus. She was also devoted to the Eucharist and the Blessed Sacrament. She had a special devotion to the Souls of Purgatory, for whom she frequently had Masses celebrated, and she had particular confidence in Saint Anthony of Padua.

== See also ==
- Catholic Church in France

== Sources ==
- "1849", Hagiography Circle, newsaints.faithweb.com
- Assum (9 May 2008), "Camille de Soyecourt", Les archives du Forum Catholique (in French), archives.leforumcatholique.org
- Baudrillart, Cardinal Alfred (January 1941), La Très Vénérable Camille de Soyécourt ou celle qui n'a pas eu peur, Pages catholiques (in French), Paris: Albin Michel, ASIN B003UAHX8O
- Biron, Marie-Paule (January 1989), Les messes clandestines pendant la Révolution (in French), Nouvelles Éditions Latines, ISBN 9782723303828
- Breton, Guy; Pauwels, Louis (2012), Histoires extraordinaires (in French), Albin Michel, pp. 119–123, ISBN 9782226232366
- "Carmélite, servante de Dieu (? 1849)", Nominis (in French), nominis.cef.fr
- Clorivière, Pierre de; Cicé, Adélaïde de (1997), Lettres de prison, 1804–1806 (in French), vol. 2, Paris: Editions Beauchesne, ISBN 9782701013572
- Commission Diocésaine d'Art Sacré, "La crypte des Carmes", L'Eglise Catholique à Paris (in French), paris.catholique.fr
- Lecuit, Jean-Baptiste (2012), Le défi de l'intériorité : Le carmel réformé en France 1611–2011 (in French), Desclée De Brouwer, p. 288, ISBN 9782220080659
- Lenôtre, G. (1933), Les Pèlerinages de PARIS Révolutionnaire : La Maison des Carmes (in French), Librairie Académique Perrin
- Machelart, Félicien (2006), Inventaire des archives de l'Assemblée des Cardinaux et Archevêques de France 1919–1964 : Fonds J.A. Chollet archevêque de Cambrai, Mythes, imaginaires, religions (in French), vol. 4, Presses Univ. Septentrion, ISBN 9782859399597
- Marty, Aurélien (2002), Tilloloy : son église – son château (in French), Montdidier: SERHAM, ISBN 978-2951322035
- Mère Saint-Jérôme (1851), La Vie de la Révérende Mère Thérèse Camille de Soyécourt, carmélite (in French), Vve Poussielgue-Rusand, p. 309
- "Renaissance du Carmel en France", Le Carmel en France (in French), carmel.asso.fr
- "Révolution et persécutions religieuses (18è-19è siècles)", Le Carmel en France (in French), carmel.asso.fr
- Séverin-Georges, Couneson (1970), Les Saints nos frères : calendrier pour chaque jour de l'année... (in French), Éditions Beauchesne
- Tavernier, Cl. (1956), "Mère Camille de Soyecourt et les " cardinaux noirs "", Revue d'histoire de l'Église de France (in French), 42 (139): 237–242, doi:10.3406/rhef.1956.3203
