= Bernardo the Japanese =

16th-century Japanese visitor to Europe

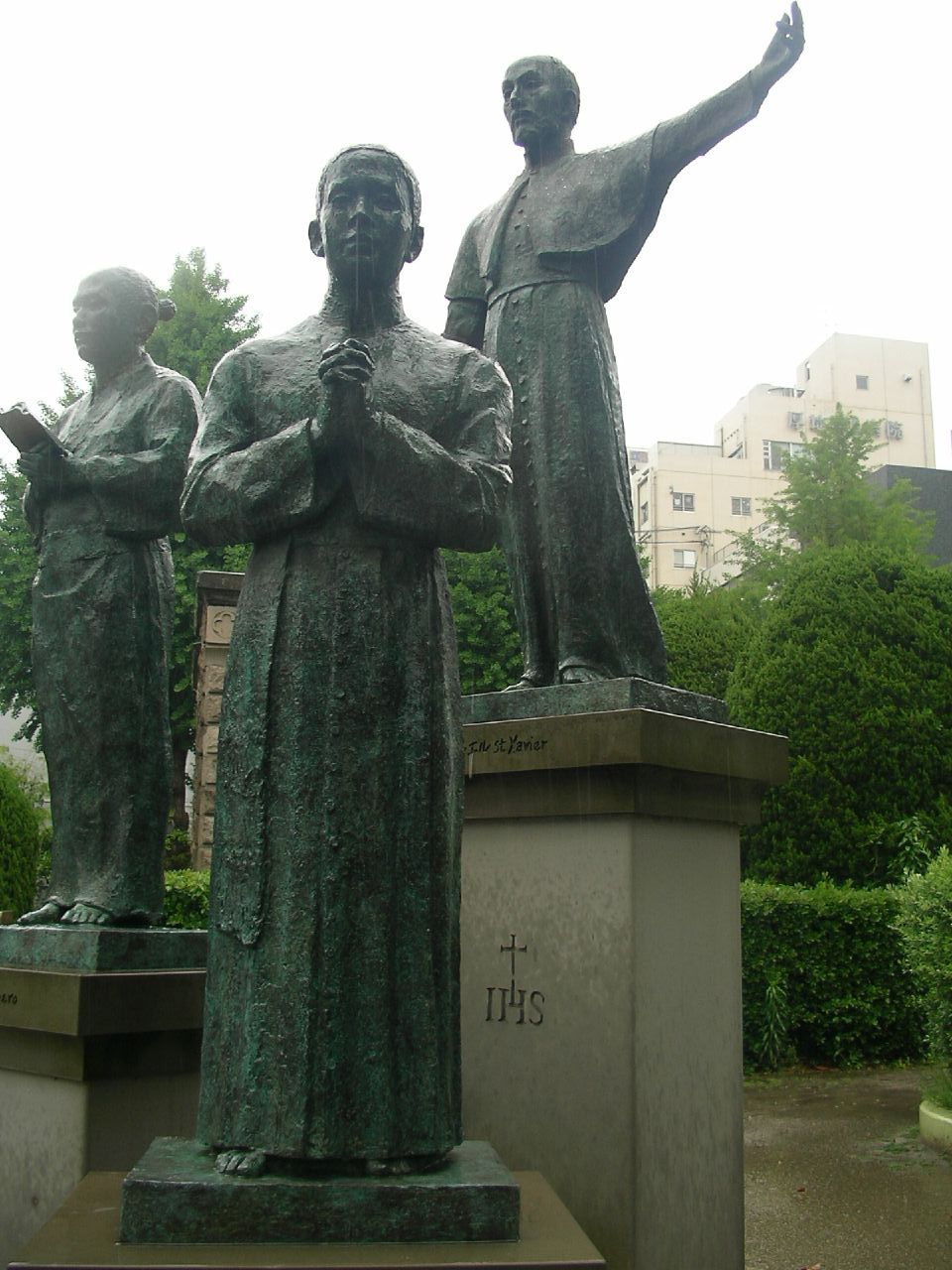
Statue of Francisco Xavier, Yajiro, and Bernardo in Xavier Park, Kagoshima.

Bernardo the Japanese (鹿児島のベルナルド, Kagoshima no Berunarudo, lit. 'Bernardo of Kagoshima,' died February 1557) was an early Japanese Christian convert of the 16th century, born in Kagoshima, and the first Japanese person to set foot in Europe. Bernardo was one of the first converts of Saint Francis Xavier, and one of his two disciples. Bernardo was baptized in 1549. He followed Xavier in Japan and India.

== Biography ==
Bernardo left Japan for Portuguese India with Xavier in 1551, together with another Japanese person, Mathias, born in Yamaguchi. They arrived in India in February 1552. Mathias died in Goa, however. Bernardo, with Brother Andreas Fernandes, then left for Portugal, where he arrived in 1553, with a letter written by Francis Xavier in Goa, dated April 8, 1552. The objective was for Bernardo "to see the Christian religion in all its majesty", so that he could share his experience back in Japan. In his letter, Xavier also commented that "Japanese intellect [was] as sharp and sensible as any in the world".

Bernardo is thought to have been the first Japanese person to set foot on European soil. In Portugal, Bernardo applied to and entered the Society of Jesus. He also studied at the College of Coimbra.

After two years, Bernardo left to visit Rome on July 17, 1554, going through Spain to Barcelona, to take a ship to Naples. He was present in Rome during a period of 10 months. He met with Loyola and probably attended the election of Pope Marcellus II. Bernardo was highly valued, and gave great hope to the Papacy about the prospects of Catholicism in Japan.

Bernardo left Rome on October 23, 1555, and took a ship in Genoa. Bernardo died, however, upon his return to Portugal in February 1557.

== See also ==
- Tenshō embassy (1582)
- William Adams, first Englishman who traveled to Japan (1600)
- Hasekura Tsunenaga, who visited Europe from 1613 to 1620
