= The Price to Pay (book) =

- Author: Joseph Fadelle
- Genre: Biography
- Published: 2012, Ignatius Press
- Media type: Print, ebook
- Pages: 232 pages
- ISBN: 1586175998

The Price to Pay is a 2012 autobiography by Joseph Fadelle, an Iraqi man who converted from Islam to Roman Catholicism. It was first published on October 3, 2012 through Ignatius Press.

== Synopsis ==
The book follows Joseph Fadelle's conversion to Roman Catholicism. Fadelle, who was previously named Muhammad, began showing an interest in Catholicism after he was conscripted into Saddam Hussein's army and roomed with Massoud, a Christian. Muhammad sees Massoud's Christianity as shocking and distasteful but as time passes Muhammad finds that he is intrigued by Christianity and eventually converts to Christianity along with his wife. Muhammad, who received baptism and chose to rename himself Joseph, undergoes a great amount of persecution from family members, culminating in them making several death threats against him.

== Reception ==
The New Oxford Review gave The Price to Pay a favorable review and praised Fadelle for including his personal struggles with forgiveness for others, as they felt it "says much about him and the losses he and his wife have endured." CatholicCulture.org president Jeff Mirus also praised the work and recommended it highly.
