= Emily Loveday =

Young English Protestant "seduced" into the Roman Catholic church

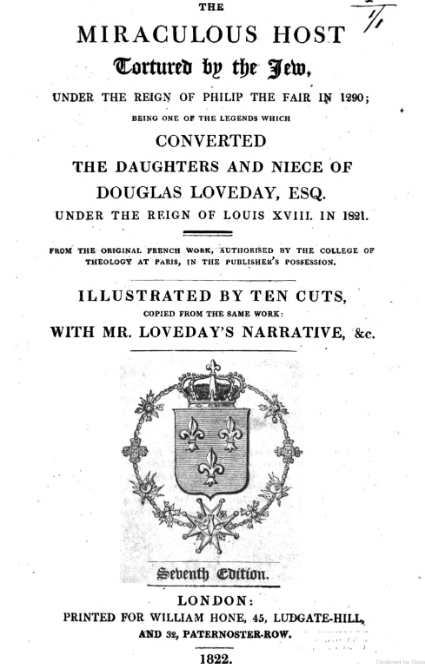
- 1822 pamphlet describing her conversion
- Born: 28 December 1799
- Died: 1850

Emily Mary Loveday (1799–1850) was an English woman at the centre of a case where her father accused her Parisian boarding school of seducing her into the Roman Catholic church. The case attracted wide interest in England and France but it was rejected and she continued to live in a Paris convent.

== Life ==
Loveday was born in 1799. She was baptised at St Pauls church in Hammersmith in London in February 1800. Her parents were Eliza (born Sharp) and Douglas Charles Loveday. Her father would become a lawyer in the Middle Temple in 1812 and four years later he bought land near Paris at Auteuil. In 1817 her father became a French citizen.

In 1819, their father decided to return to Britain and he paid for her, her younger sister, Matilda Susan, and her cousin, Mary, to live in a boarding school in Paris maintained by Ernestine Reboul.

Her father was annoyed when he returned and he discovered that they had been converted to Roman Catholicism while at the school in Paris. The sisters were removed from the school in October 1821 and their cousin sometime later. They had all become Catholics and although Matilda was willing to return to being a Protestant, Emily refused to recant. He documented his accusation and sent it to the Chamber of Deputies.

Emily decided to leave and join a convent.

In December 1821, her father accused the headmistress of seducing his daughters and accused her of rapt de séduction. Rapt de séduction was an unusual accusation in this case as the crime was intended to cover a situation where a minor was seduced into an elopement not into a religious conversion.

12,000 copies of his accusation were printed and the affair was discussed in British newspapers including The Times. In France over twenty pamphlets were published including "The Miraculous Host Tortured by the Jew Under the Reign of Philip the Fair in 1290. Being One of the Legends which Converted the Daughters and Niece of Douglas Loveday" which was translated into English. It was published by William Hone to expose the "priest-ridden Bourbon regime". By 1822 the issue was mentioned in parliament and the press published accounts of what Emily had said and the headmistress's defence.

French law had a principle of paternal authority, but as Emily was an adult the chamber of deputies and the chamber of peers did not uphold her father's case. Emily remained at the convent in Paris.
