= Roy Schoeman =

Author and Jew who converted to catholic church

Roy H. Schoeman (born in 1951 in New York City) is a Catholic and author who has converted from Judaism to Catholicism. Due to his decision of faith, he gave up a career in the field of economics and is now devoted to the Christian mission.

== Life ==
Roy Schoeman's Jewish parents fled from Nazi Germany to New York, where he was born and grew up. He received his Jewish education from Conservative rabbis such as Arthur Hertzberg and Arthur Green, later President of the Reconstructionist Rabbinical College in Philadelphia. He was also a disciple and follower of the charismatic Hasidic rabbi Shlomo Carlebach for a brief period after High School.

He studied at the Massachusetts Institute of Technology (MIT) and Harvard Business School, where he received an MBA magna cum laude and joined the Marketing faculty as a Lecturer. In retrospect, he describes his childhood and youth as very religious, but he lost his belief in God while at MIT, leading to a sense of meaninglessness despite his success. He attributes his conversion to Christianity to a theophany of Christ followed a year later by a supposed direct experience of the Virgin Mary. Following several short stays at a Carthusian (Carthusians) monastery, the Carthusian priest and Prior Marcellin Theeuwes became his spiritual director. .

Today he gives lectures and appears as a conference, retreat, and Parish mission speaker, as well as on television and radio shows in Christian media.

== Religious theses ==
In his work, Salvation is from the Jews, Schoeman has detailed his views on the role of Judaism in Christian salvation history. He sees Christianity, and specifically the Catholic Church, as the fulfillment of Judaism, and therefore inivites Jews to enter the Catholic Church, which he describes as "post-Messianic" Judaism.

Any Jew who does not recognize that Jesus was the Jewish Messiah has not understood the true role of Judaism in the history of salvation.

— Roy Schoeman

He attributes the Holocaust to a diabolically inspired hatred of the Jews for their role in bringing Christianity to the world, and suggests that its suffering is expiatory in preparation for the coming return of Christ (parousia). He also traces the interaction between the anti-Semitism and activities of Islamic and Nazi National Socialist leaders leading up to, during, and after the Holocaust.

== Praise and criticism ==
Cardinal Raymond Leo Burke praised Schoeman's book, Honey from the Rock:

"Roy Schoeman's work, Honey from the Rock illuminates the essential link between the Jewish faith and Catholicism through the lives of those who were born into the Jewish faith and have come to know the fulfillment of their faith in Christ and His Catholic Church. […] Honey from the Rock illustrates in a most concrete way the truth expounded so well by Roy Schoeman in his earlier work, Salvation is from the Jews, which I also wholeheartedly recommend."

— Raymond L. Burke

Schoeman's statements on the mission to the Jews were also criticized from various sides. Though Schoeman's statements are philosemitic, he has also been criticized by Jews for his interpretation of Judaism.

== Publications ==
- Salvation Is from the Jews: The Role of Judaism in Salvation History, Ignatius Press, 2003, ISBN 0-89870-975-X, German: Salvation comes from the Jews. God's plan for his people (Augsburg 2007), French:Le Salut vient des Juifs, Lethielleux, 2011, ISBN 978-2249622120.
- https://web.archive.org/web/20071029044625/http://www.christenundjuden.org///de/?item=589
- Honey from the rock. Sixteen Jews Find the Sweetness of Christ, Ignatius Press, 2007, ISBN 1-58617-115-1.
- Judaism: from the Catholic perspective, London: Catholic Truth Society, 2008, ISBN 978-1-86082-426-5.
