= Leijten =

Leijten is a Dutch surname. Notable people with the surname include:

- Nick Leijten (born 1991), Dutch footballer
- Renske Leijten (born 1979), Dutch politician

== See also ==
- Henriette van Lynden-Leijten (1950–2010), Dutch diplomat
