= Hans Strikwerda =

Dutch organizational theorist

Johannes (Hans) Strikwerda (born 3 December 1952, Naaldwijk) is a Dutch organizational theorist, management consultant, and Professor of Business Administration at the University of Amsterdam, known for his work on implementation of shared services centers in the public sector, and on the concept of multidimensional organizations.

== Biography ==
Strikwerda obtained his BA in applied mathematics at the University of Groningen in 1976, and in 1979 his MBA at the Inter-Faculty of Business Administration in Delft, now Rotterdam School of Management. In 1994 he obtained his PhD from the University of Tilburg with the thesis, entitled "Organisatie-advisering, Wetenschap en Pragmatisme" (Organizational consulting: science and pragmatism)" under supervision of John Rijsman.

After his graduation in Delft Strikwerda started his career in several positions at the Dutch Government, and was business consultant at the Philips Electronics from 1994 to 1998. In 1995 he started as founder the Nolan Norton Institute, a management consultancy firm, and in 1996 he was appointed Professor of Organization and Change at the University of Amsterdam. In 2005 he was elected most influential management consultant in the Netherlands.

== Work ==
=== Shared services centers ===
Minnaar & Vosselman (2013) explained, that the shared services center is a "rather independent organizational unit that provides services to various other organizational units. This concept solves the problem that each business unit is engaged in tasks that do not belong to its core business, such as HRM, IT and Accounting and Finance. Because of improved ICT, it is now possible to concentrate these kinds of tasks in a separate service unit and to realize economies of scale."

Strikwerda (2005) had determined that with the introduction of shared services centers the "benefits of a divisional business organization are kept, but without the cost disadvantages."

=== Multidimensional organizations ===
In the 2007 paper "The Emergence of the Multidimensional Organization" Strikwerda explained the development of the concept:

The concept of the multidimensional organization has been written about by a number of authors (Ackoff, 1977; Ackoff, 1994; Galbraith, 2005; Prahalad, 1980; Prahalad & Doz, 1979; Reber & Strehl, 1988). However none of the other publications on organization forms, especially Williamson (1985) do mention the multidimensional organization (and neither of the so much discussed matrix-organization). Apparently the concept of the multidimensional organization has got lost in the literature...

However, Strikwerda concluded that "the rediscovery of the multidimensional organization, including an understanding of its working, first of all provides entrepreneurs, executives, managers, workers and investors with new opportunities to pursue opportunities and to create wealth."

== Selected publications ==
- Strikwerda, J. Shared service centers. Van Gorcum, 2004.
- Strikwerda, Hans. Growth, Governance and Organisation: On power strategy and modular organisation. Nolan, Norton & Company, 2005.
- Strikwerda, Hans. Van unitmanagement naar de multidimensionale organisatie. Uitgeverij Van Gorcum, 2008.
- Strikwerda, Johannes. Shared service centers II: van kostenbesparing naar waardecreatie. Uitgeverij Van Gorcum, 2010.

Articles, a selection:

- Strikwerda, J. "Postmodernisme, postmoderne organisaties en implicaties voor management control." Maandblad Voor Accountancy En Bedrijfseconomie 15.41 (2003): 242-242.
- Strikwerda, J. "Na het shared service center: de modulaire organisatie." Holland Management Review 23 (2006): 45–50.
- Strikwerda, J. The Emergence of the Multidimensional Organization. 2007 paper, p. 9-10.
