= Gilze en Rijen =

- Municipality
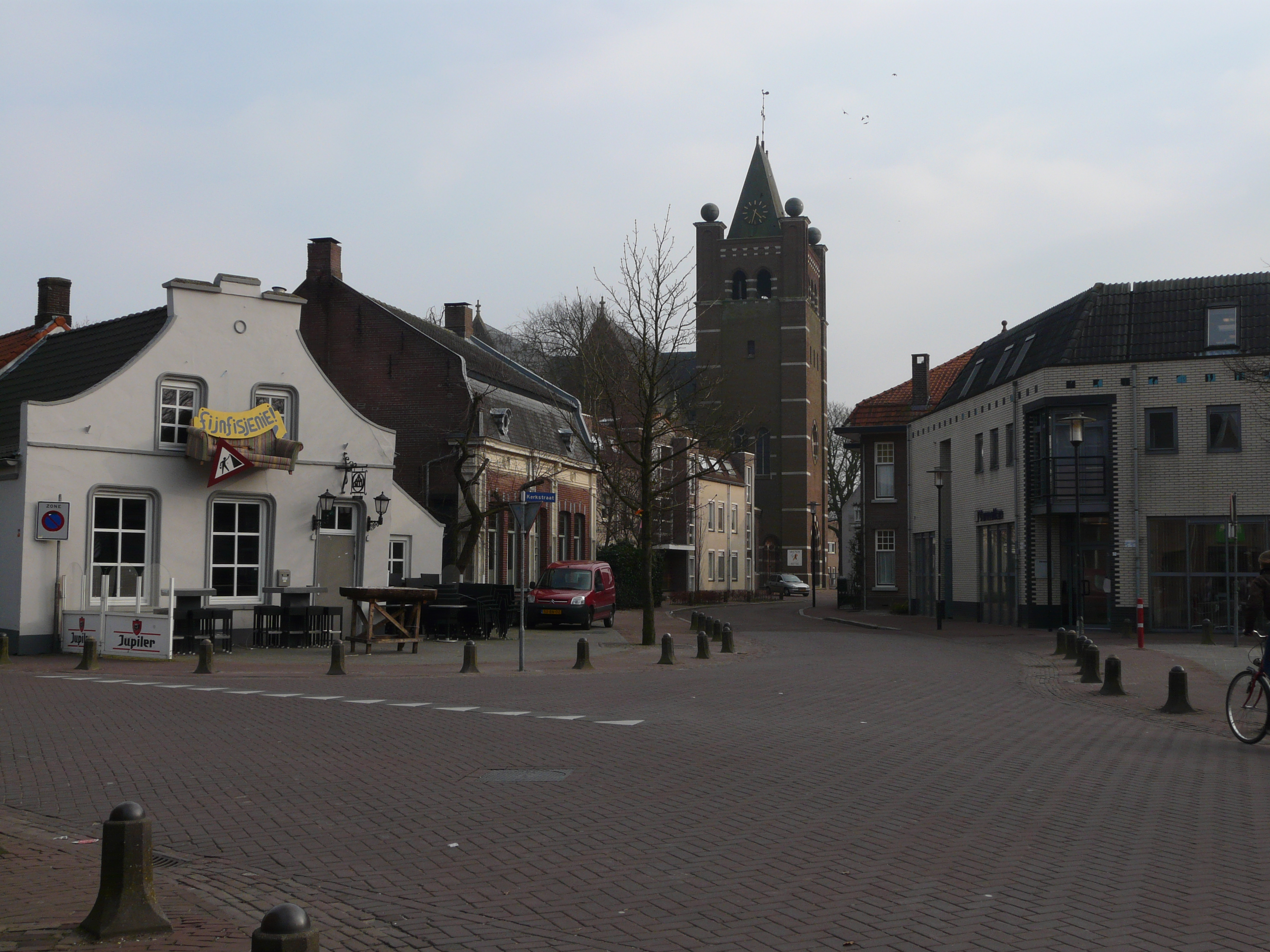
- Square in Gilze

- Flag Coat of arms

- Location in North Brabant
- Coordinates: 51°35′N 4°55′E
- Country: Netherlands
- Province: North Brabant

Government
  - Body: Municipal council
  - Mayor: Derk Alssema

Area
  - Total: 65.66 km^{2} (25.35 sq mi)
  - Land: 65.38 km^{2} (25.24 sq mi)
  - Water: 0.28 km^{2} (0.11 sq mi)
- Elevation: 10 m (33 ft)

Population (January 2021)
  - Total: 26,723
  - Density: 409/km^{2} (1,060/sq mi)
- Time zone: UTC+1 (CET)
  - Summer (DST): UTC+2 (CEST)
- Postcode: 5120–5126
- Area code: 0161
- Website: www.gilzerijen.nl

Gilze en Rijen (Dutch pronunciation: [ˌɣɪlzə ʔɛn ˈrɛiə(n)]) is a municipality in the southern Netherlands. The municipality contains four villages: Rijen, Gilze, Hulten and Molenschot. It is home to the Gilze-Rijen Air Base.

Rijen grew in the 19th century due to its leather factories.

== Population centres ==
- Rijen (population: 16,581)
- Gilze (7,729)
- Molenschot (1,341)
- Hulten (328)

=== Topography ===
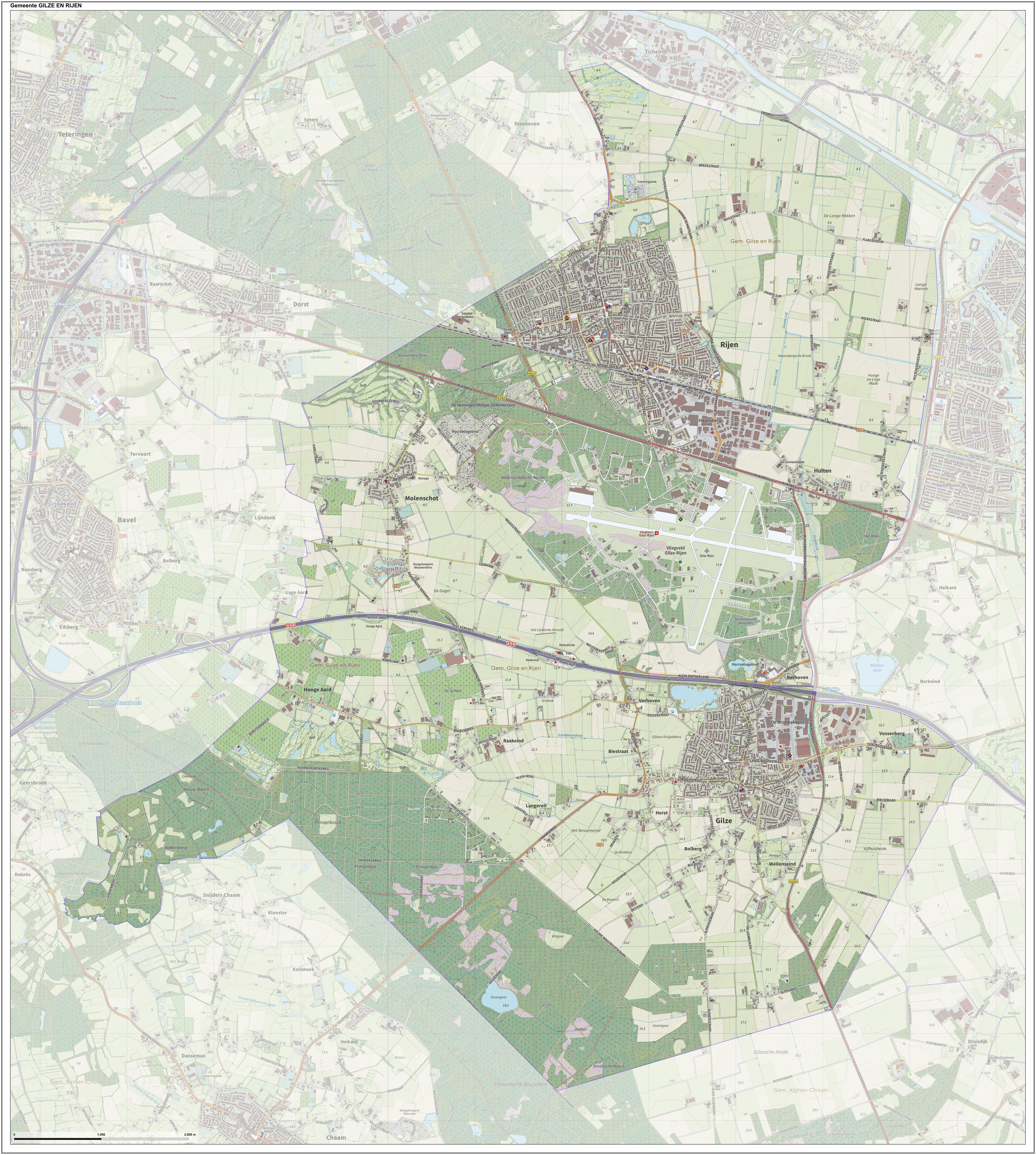

Dutch Topographic map of the municipality of Gilze en Rijen, June 2015

== Transportation ==
Railway Station: Gilze-Rijen

== Climate ==
The climate in this area has mild differences between highs and lows, and there is adequate rainfall year-round. According to the Köppen Climate Classification system, Gilze en Rijen has a marine west coast climate, abbreviated "Cfb" on climate maps.

On 24 July 2019, temperatures in Gilze en Rijen reached as high as 39.2 °C (102.6 °F), the highest temperature ever recorded in The Netherlands until it was surpassed by Eindhoven the same day. However, a day later, on 25 July, temperatures in Gilze en Rijen reached 40.7 °C (105.3 °F), making it the first place ever in The Netherlands where 40 °C (104 °F) was measured and took away the record back from Eindhoven. Climate change was found to be the culprit of such hot temperatures in Netherlands.

Climate data for Gilze en Rijen (1991−2020 normals, extremes 1951−present)
Month	Jan	Feb	Mar	Apr	May	Jun	Jul	Aug	Sep	Oct	Nov	Dec	Year
Record high °C (°F)	15.2 (59.4)	19.5 (67.1)	24.7 (76.5)	29.1 (84.4)	33.2 (91.8)	34.7 (94.5)	40.7 (105.3)	36.2 (97.2)	35.1 (95.2)	27.2 (81.0)	20.3 (68.5)	15.9 (60.6)	40.7 (105.3)
Mean daily maximum °C (°F)	6.2 (43.2)	7.3 (45.1)	10.9 (51.6)	15.4 (59.7)	18.9 (66.0)	21.7 (71.1)	23.7 (74.7)	23.5 (74.3)	19.9 (67.8)	15.1 (59.2)	10.0 (50.0)	6.7 (44.1)	14.9 (58.8)
Daily mean °C (°F)	3.5 (38.3)	3.9 (39.0)	6.6 (43.9)	9.9 (49.8)	13.6 (56.5)	16.4 (61.5)	18.4 (65.1)	18.0 (64.4)	14.8 (58.6)	11.0 (51.8)	6.9 (44.4)	4.1 (39.4)	10.6 (51.1)
Mean daily minimum °C (°F)	0.4 (32.7)	0.3 (32.5)	2.1 (35.8)	4.1 (39.4)	7.7 (45.9)	10.6 (51.1)	12.8 (55.0)	12.4 (54.3)	9.8 (49.6)	6.8 (44.2)	3.5 (38.3)	1.2 (34.2)	6.0 (42.8)
Record low °C (°F)	−19.3 (−2.7)	−20.2 (−4.4)	−14.2 (6.4)	−7.3 (18.9)	−2.3 (27.9)	1.5 (34.7)	3.9 (39.0)	3.9 (39.0)	−0.4 (31.3)	−6.7 (19.9)	−10.8 (12.6)	−17.0 (1.4)	−20.2 (−4.4)
Average precipitation mm (inches)	68.0 (2.68)	63.1 (2.48)	54.8 (2.16)	42.5 (1.67)	59.8 (2.35)	66.5 (2.62)	81.4 (3.20)	71.6 (2.82)	65.4 (2.57)	69.9 (2.75)	74.2 (2.92)	81.9 (3.22)	799.1 (31.46)
Average relative humidity (%)	87.0	84.1	78.9	73.1	72.9	74.3	75.5	77.1	81.6	85.4	89.2	89.0	80.7
Mean monthly sunshine hours	70.6	89.9	138.1	188.4	215.7	210.1	212.2	198.1	159.4	119.4	71.7	57.5	1,731.1
Percentage possible sunshine	27.0	31.8	37.4	45.4	44.6	42.3	42.5	43.7	41.9	36.0	26.7	23.5	36.9
Source: Royal Netherlands Meteorological Institute

== Notable people ==
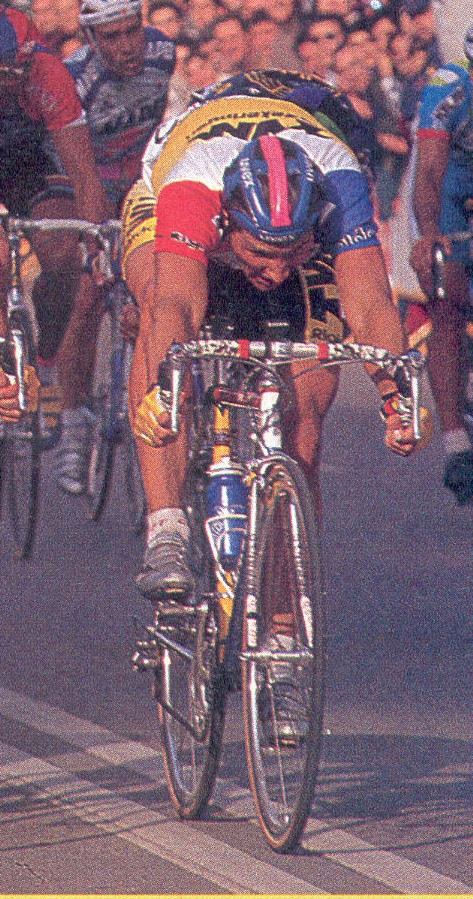
Jeroen Blijlevens, 2006

- Marcellin Theeuwes (1936 in Gilze en Rijen – 2019) was a Dutch Carthusian monk
- Jacques Theeuwes (born 1944 in Rijen) a Dutch economist, accountant and academic
- Henriette van Lynden-Leijten (1950 in Gilze en Rijen – 2010) a Dutch Baroness and diplomat to Bulgaria and the Vatican

=== Sport ===
- Janus Theeuwes (1886 in Gilze en Rijen – 1975) an archer, gold medallist in the 1920 Summer Olympics
- Joep van den Ouweland (born 1984 in Gilze en Rijen) is a Dutch footballer with over 300 club caps
- Cees Doorakkers (born 1963 in Gilze) a former Grand Prix motorcycle road racer
- Jeroen Blijlevens (born 1971 in Gilze en Rijen) a retired road bicycle racer

== See also ==
- Heikant, Rijen

== Gallery ==
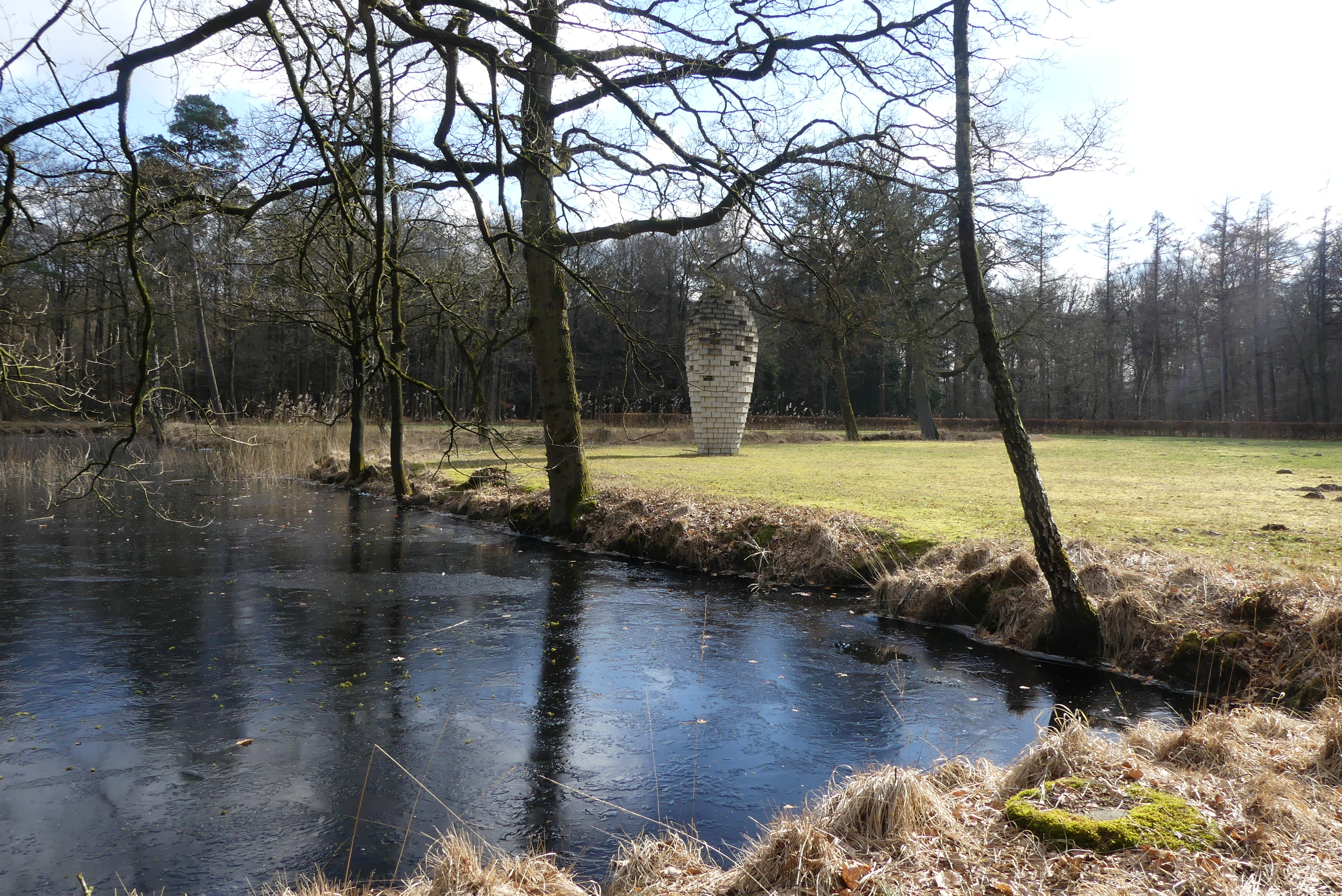
Natuurgebied De Duiventoren

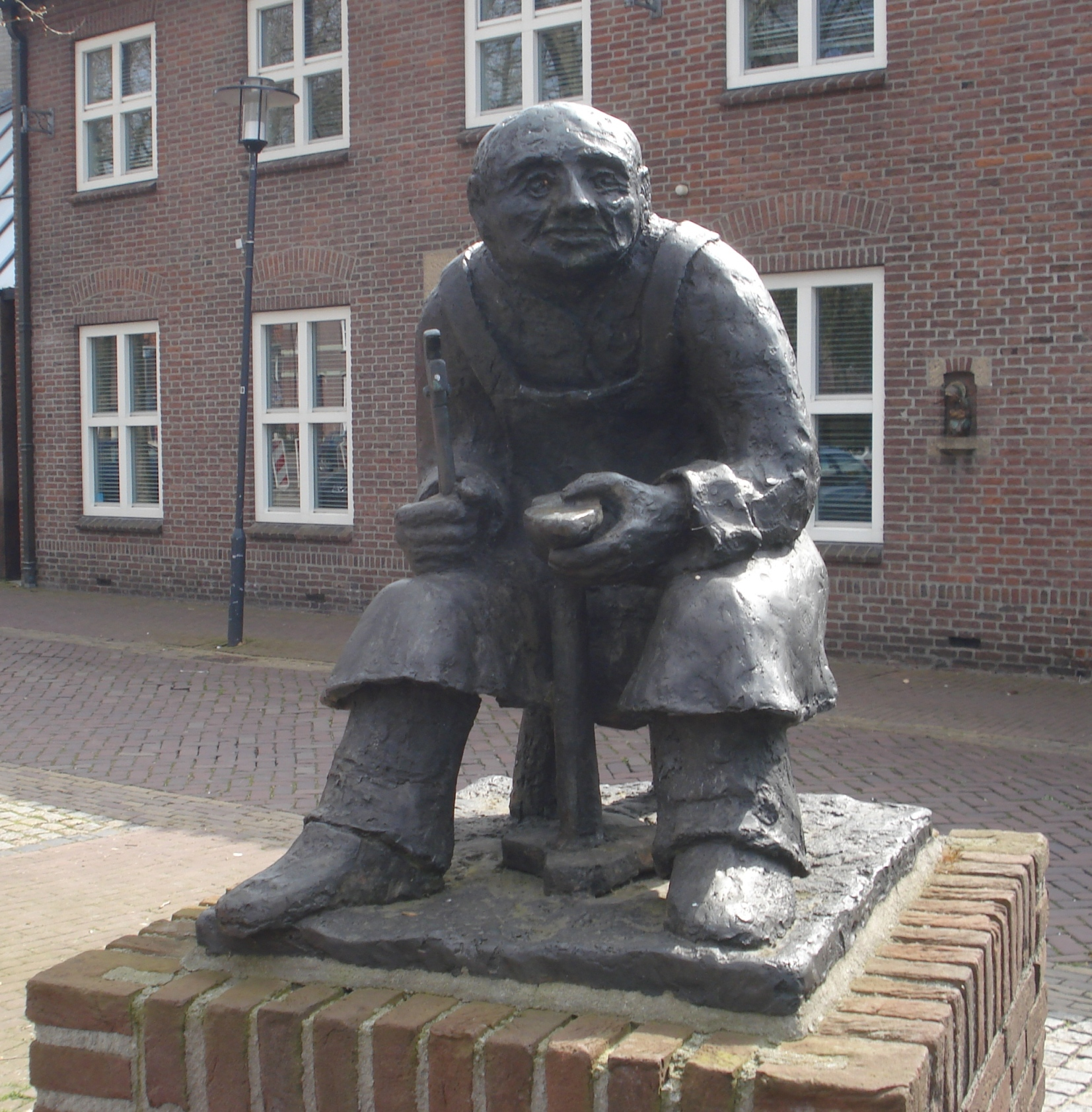
Gilze en rijen kunstwerk schoenmaker

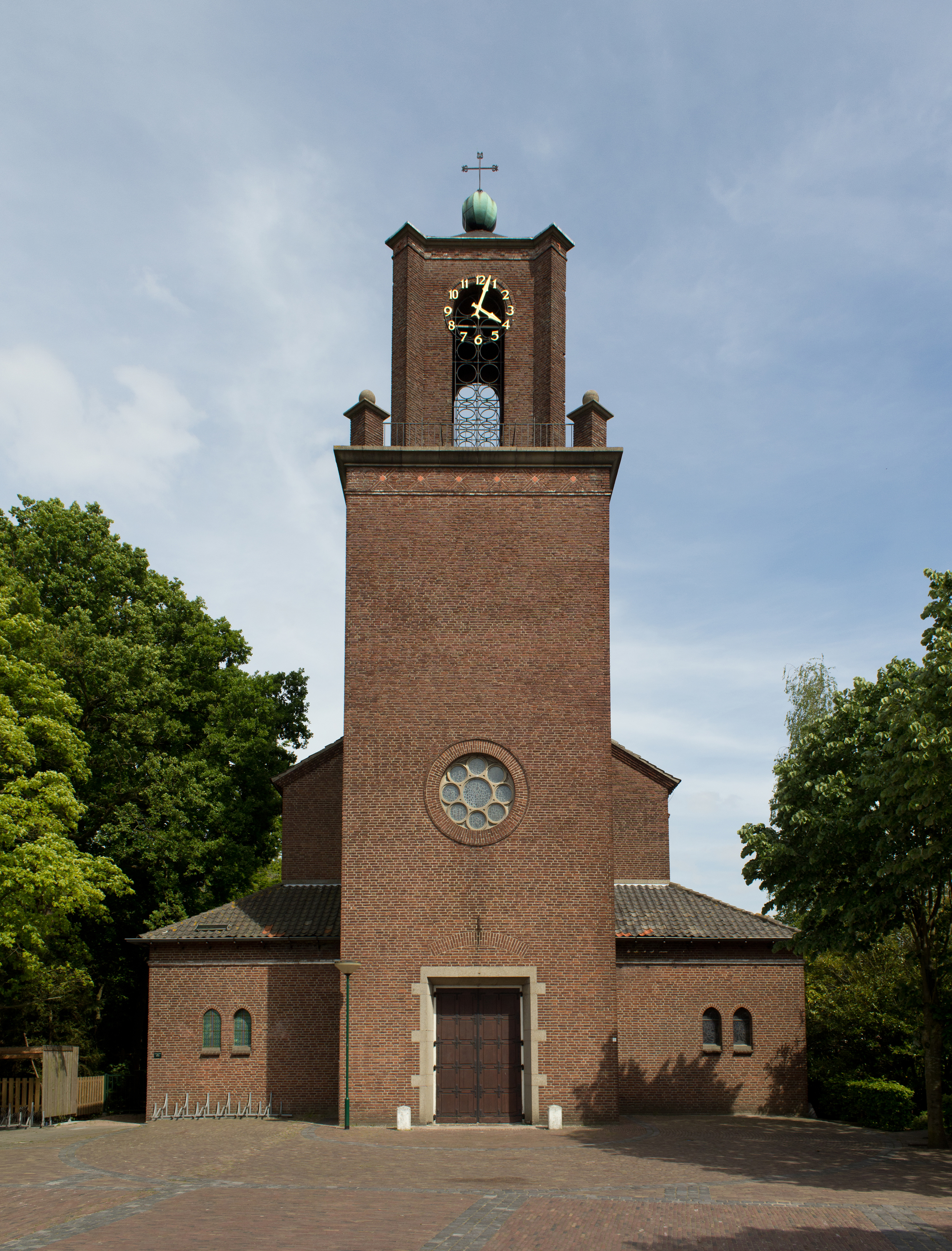
Gerardus Majellakerk

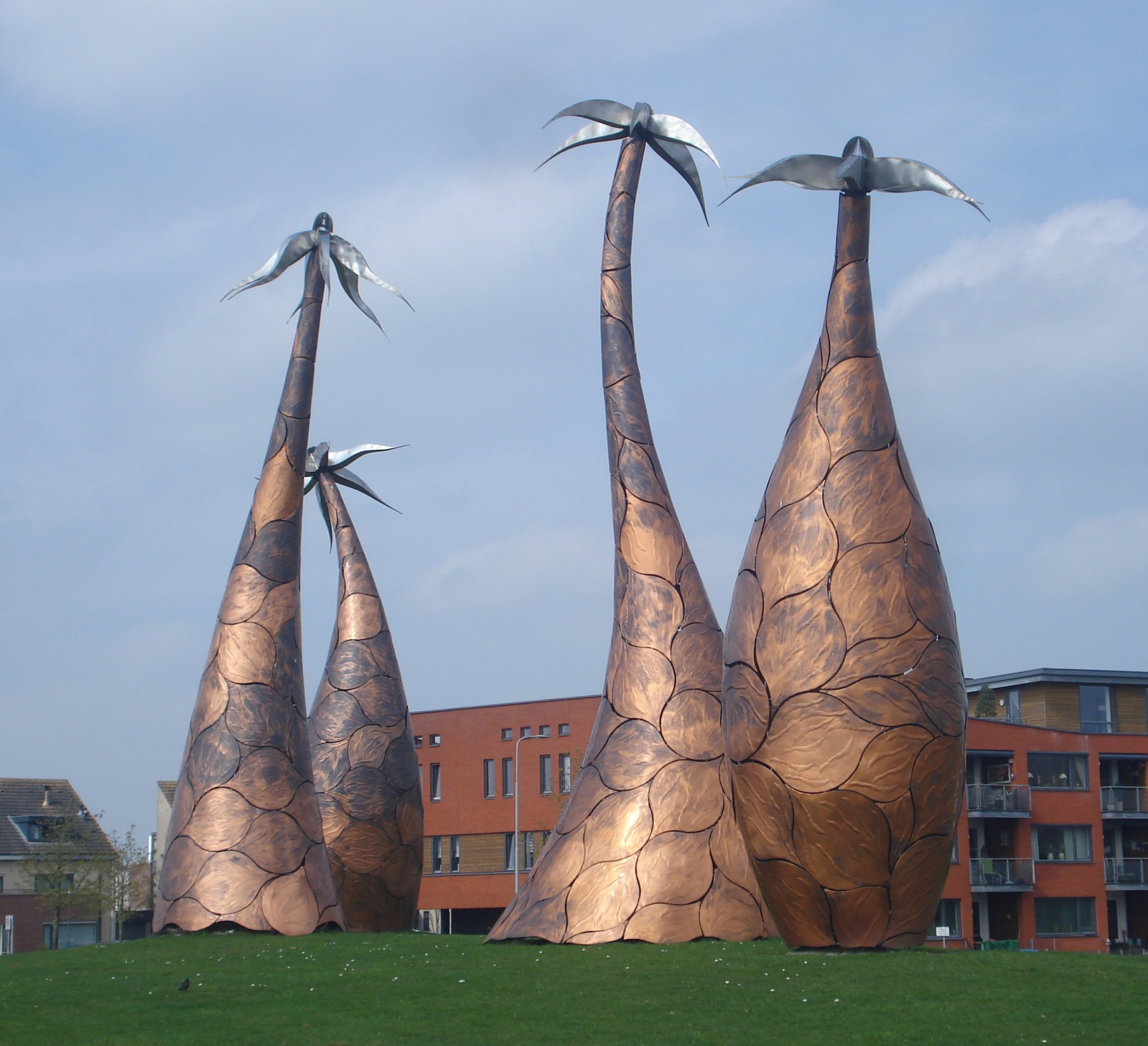
Gilze en rijen kunstwerk margrieten
