= Wim van Hulst =

Dutch business economist (1939–2018)

Wilhelmus Gijsbertus Henri (Wim) van Hulst (18 April 1939 – 5 May 2018) was a Dutch business economist who was Emeritus Professor Business Economics at the Tilburg University.

== Biography ==
Born in Breda Van Hulst received his MA in business economics in 1965 at the Tilburg University, where in 1973 he also received his Phd for the thesis "De vervanging van duurzame produktiemiddelen" (The replacement of sustainable means of production) under supervision of Piet A. Verheyen.

Van Hulst in 1967 started his academic career as faculty member at the Tilburg University, Department of Economics. In 1977 he was Visiting Professor at the Anton de Kom University of Suriname. In 1973 he was appointment lector, and in 1978 appointed Professor of Business Economics at the Tilburg University. Among his doctoral students were Theo Bemelmans (1976) and Martin Wyn (1988). He retired at the Tilburg University in 2004.

Wim van Hulst died on 5 May 2018, at the age of 79.

== Publications ==
Books, a selection:

- 1973. De vervanging van duurzame produktiemiddelen. Doctoral thesis Tilburg University
- 1981. On the concept of divergence in the theory of industrial organization. No. 102. Tilburg University, Faculty of Economics and Business Administration.
- 1989. Externe organisatie : een kennismaking met het ondernemingsgedrag in markteconomische stelsels With J.G.L.M. Willems. Leiden : Stenfert Kroese.
- 1996. Schakeringen in de bedrijfseconometrie : opstellen aangeboden aan prof. dr. P.A. Verheyen bij gelegenheid van zijn afscheid als hoogleraar in de bedrijfseconometrie aan de Katholieke Universiteit Brabant te Tilburg op 22 november 1996. With T.M.A. Bemelmans and Piet A. Verheyen (eds).
- 1999. Bedrijfseconomie Deel I: Grondslagen en Perspectieven. With Michael Corbey
