= Anne-Françoise Rutkowski =

French psychologist

Anne-Françoise Rutkowski (born 25 June 1970) is a French psychologist and a Professor of Management of Information: Impact on Organization, Business and Society at the Tilburg University School of Economics and Management. She is well-known for her work on virtual collaboration.

== Biography ==
Born in Lille, Rutkowski received her MA in Social psychology at the Charles de Gaulle University – Lille III in 1993, and her Ph.D. in Cognitive and Social Psychology in 1999 at the Tilburg University with a thesis entitled "The social co-construction of the referential world : a redefinition of human morality" under supervision of John Rijsman.

Rutkowski had started her career as psycho-metrical test developer in 1994 for the French Ministry of Interior. The next year she returned to the academic world, and as lecturer at the University of Lille III, where she became Assistant professor in 1997. In 1998 she moved to the Tilburg University as Assistant researcher, in Associate Professor in 2005 and Professor Management of Information: Impact on Organization, Business and Society since 2013.

Rutkowski was awarded the "First Annual AIS 2004 (Association for Information Systems) Award for Innovation in Information Systems Education" in 2004.

== Publications ==
Rutkowski authored and co-authored many publications in her field of expertise. Books, a selection:

- 1999. The social co-construction of the referential world : a redefinition of human morality. Doctoral thesis Tilburg University.

Articles, a selection:

- Rutkowski, A. F., Vogel, D. R., Van Genuchten, M., Bemelmans, T. M., & Favier, M. (2002). E-collaboration: The reality of virtuality. Professional Communication, IEEE Transactions on, 45(4), 219-230.
- Rutkowski, A. F., Vogel, D., Bemelmans, T. M. A., & Van Genuchten, M. (2002). Group support systems and virtual collaboration: The HKNet project. Group Decision and Negotiation, 11(2), 101-125.
- Rutkowski, Anne-Françoise; Rijsman, John B.; Gergen, Mary (2004). "Paradoxical Laughter at a Victim as Communication with a Non-victim". International Review of Social Psychology 17 (4): 5–11
- Rutkowski, Anne-Françoise, et al. "“Is It Already 4 am in Your Time Zone?” Focus Immersion and Temporal Dissociation in Virtual Teams." Small group research 38.1 (2007): 98-129.
