= Marcellin Theeuwes =

Dutch Carthusian monk (1936–2019)

- Born: Jacobus "Jac" Johannes Maria Theeuwes; 12 May 1936; Gilze en Rijen, Netherlands
- Died: 2 January 2019 (aged 82); Méounes-lès-Montrieux, France
- Occupation: Monk

Marcellin Theeuwes (12 May 1936 – 2 January 2019) was a Dutch Carthusian monk.

From a very young age, Theeuwes was attracted by the monastic vocation and enrolled at the (now defunct) Mariënkroon Abbey (nl). He joined the Carthusians in 1961 and entered into the Sélignac Charterhouse in December of that year. He was ordained a priest on 25 June 1966. He then went to the Our Lady of Mougères Monastery, and later to the Chartreuse de Montrieux (fr).

In June 1997, he was sent to the Grande Chartreuse and elected General Minister of the Carthusians, succeeding Dom Poisson. He was the 72nd General Minister after Saint Bruno and the fourth Dutchman.

He resigned as General Minister in 2012, citing health concerns. Pope Benedict XVI granted his resignation request. He was succeeded by Dom François-Marie Velut. After recovering from an illness, Theeuwes began attending public meetings again in 2015.

Marcellin Theeuwes died on 2 January 2019 at the Chartreuse de Montrieux.

Dom Marcellin Theeuwes can be seen in the award-winning 2005 documentary Into Great Silence by Philip Gröning.
