= Jacques Theeuwes =

Dutch economist

Jacobus A.M. (Jacques) Theeuwes (born 17 April 1944) is a Dutch economist, accountant, consultant and Emeritus Professor of Business economics at the Eindhoven University of Technology, known for his contributions to the fields of Management Accounting en Operations Management.

== Biography ==
Born in Rijen where his father Nico Theeuwes was an accountant, Theeuwes studied at the Tilburg University, where he received his MA in Economics in 1966, and in 1968 became certified public accountant. Later in his career in 1985 he also received his PhD at the Eindhoven University of Technology with a thesis entitled "Voorzien van informatie : methoden voor informatiebeleidsvorming en informatieplanning" (Information supply: Methods for information policy and planning information) under supervision of Theo Bemelmans.

In 1968 he started his academic career as faculty member at the Department of Economics at the Tilburg University. In 1970 he moved to the Department of Technology Management of the Eindhoven University of Technology. In 1986 he was appointed Professor of Business economics, specifically the Economic Appreciation of Administrative Information Management, where in 2003 he retired. Among his PhD students where Marc Wouters, Michael Corbey, Ed Vosselman, and Peter Verdaasdonk.

Theeuwes has been consultant, and has chaired the Department of Business Economics and Marketing of the Eindhoven University of Technology for many years. He member of the editorial board of the Maandblad voor Accountancy en Bedrijfseconomie and the journal Bedrijfskunde.

== Publications ==
Books, a selection:

- 1982. Orderafhandeling: op tijd leveren : stap voor stap naar een betere orderafhandeling in middelgrote en kleinere produktiebedrijven. Den Haag : NIVE, Nederlandse vereniging voor management
- 1984. Integrating management control and operational control. With Johan J.A. Bakker and Johan C. Wortmann. Eindhoven : University of Technology
- 1987. Informatieplanning. Kluwer.

Articles, a selection:

- Theeuwes, Jacques AM, and Jacques KM Adriaansen. "Towards an integrated accounting framework for manufacturing improvement." International Journal of Production Economics 36.1 (1994): 85-96.
