= Rijen =

- Town
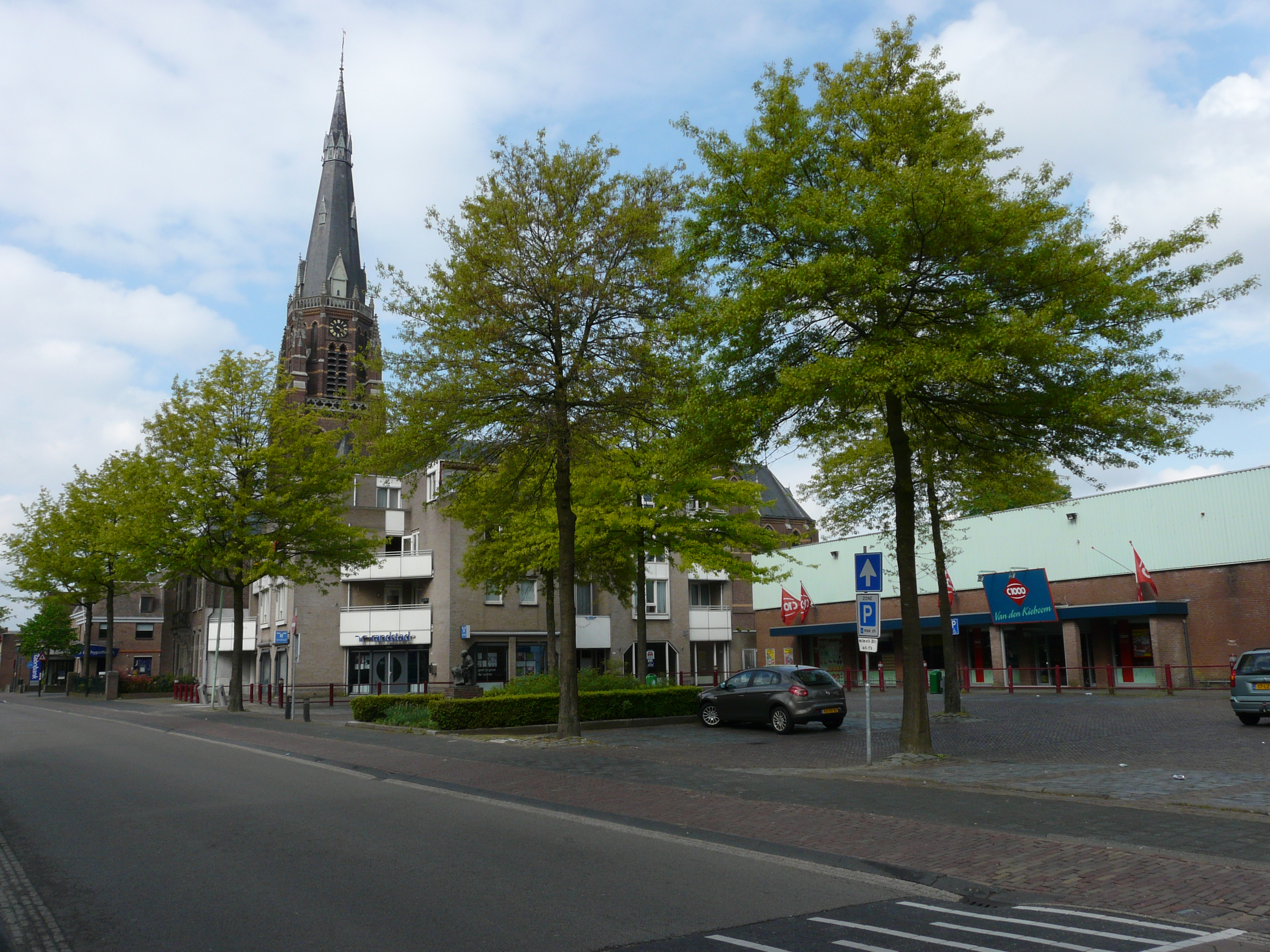
- Main street
- Interactive map of Rijen
- Coordinates: 51°35′N 4°57′E
- Country: Netherlands
- Province: North Brabant
- Municipality: Gilze en Rijen

Area
  - Total: 18.47 km^{2} (7.13 sq mi)
- Elevation: 11 m (36 ft)

Population (2021)
  - Total: 16,800
  - Density: 910/km^{2} (2,360/sq mi)
- Time zone: UTC+1 (CET)
  - Summer (DST): UTC+2 (CEST)
- Postal code: 5121
- Dialing code: 0161

Rijen is the largest place in the Dutch municipality of Gilze en Rijen. The city hall is located here. Rijen is situated north of the A58, between Breda and Tilburg. Surrounding places are: Dorst, Dongen and Oosterhout.

== History ==
Rijen has been a hamlet of Gilze for years, which belonged to the Barony of Breda. In 1464 a chapel was added to this hamlet and was raised to an independent parish. Rijen stayed smaller than Gilze for a long time. In the period of 1831-1838, during the Belgian Revolution, many Dutch soldiers were encamped at Rijen. A few years later, in 1863, the Gilze-Rijen station was opened. This gave the opportunity for the industry to grow. Especially the leather industry grew very fast and the town with it. During the second World War, the existing town hall in Gilze was destroyed and rebuilt in the now bigger Rijen.

== Public transport ==
Gilze-Rijen railway station is located at the south of Rijen, trains in the directions of Breda, Tilburg, 's-Hertogenbosch and Dordrecht leave here. Train services are done by Nederlandse Spoorwegen. Busses leave from this station as well to: Gilze, Tilburg, Breda, Oosterhout and Dongen. Bus services are operated by Arriva.

- Bus 131 : Breda - Dorst - Rijen - Gilze - Tilburg
- Bus 297 : Oosterhout - Dorst - Molenschot - Rijen
- Bus 298 : 's Gravenmoer - Dongen - Rijen

== Born in Rijen ==
- Jeroen Blijlevens (b. 1971), retired road bicycle racer
- Jacques Theeuwes (b. 1944), Emeritus Professor of Business economics
- Janus Theeuwes (1886 – 1975), archer from the Netherlands
- Willy van de Wiel (b. 1982), Dutch darts player

== Gallery ==
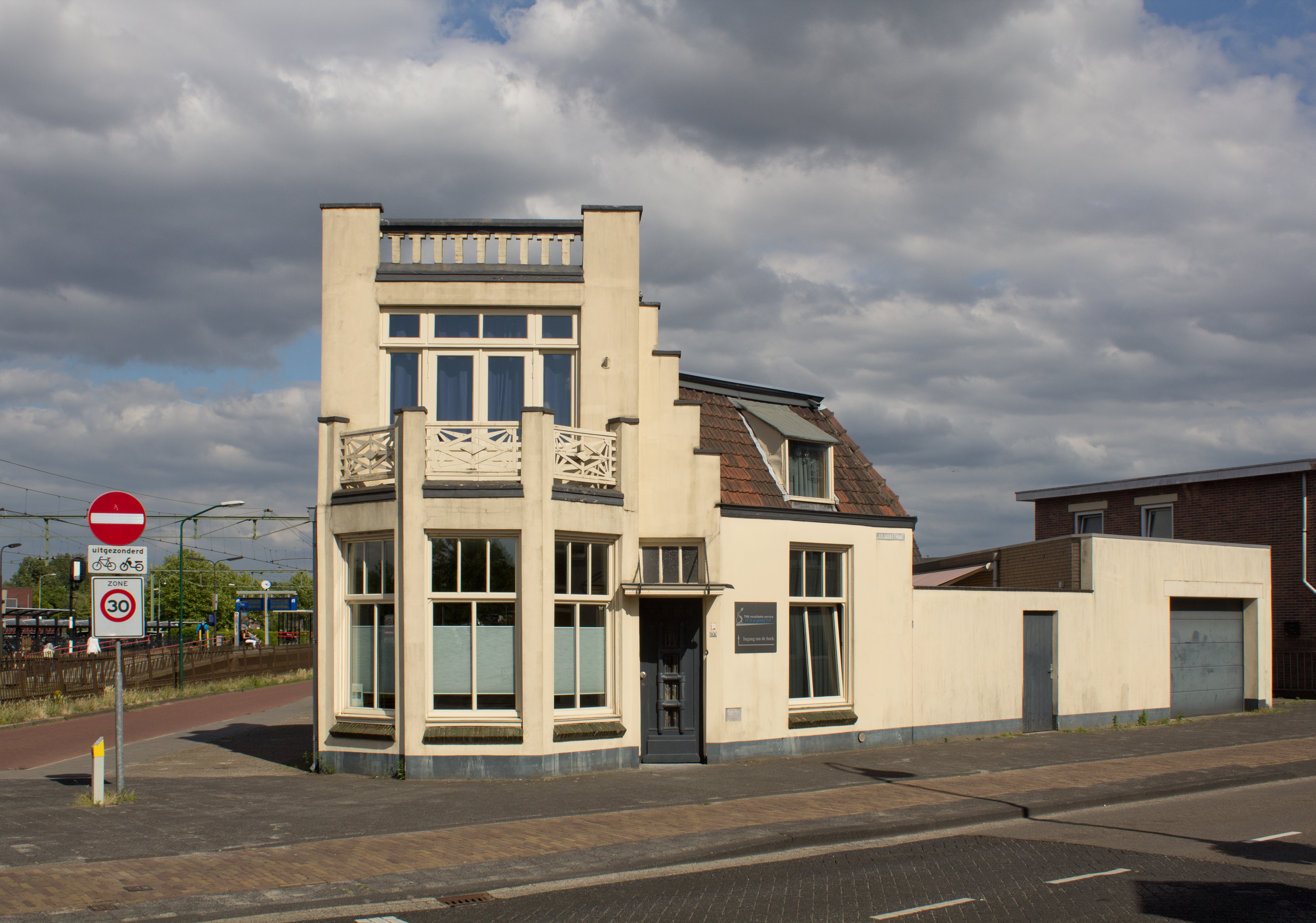
House in Rijen

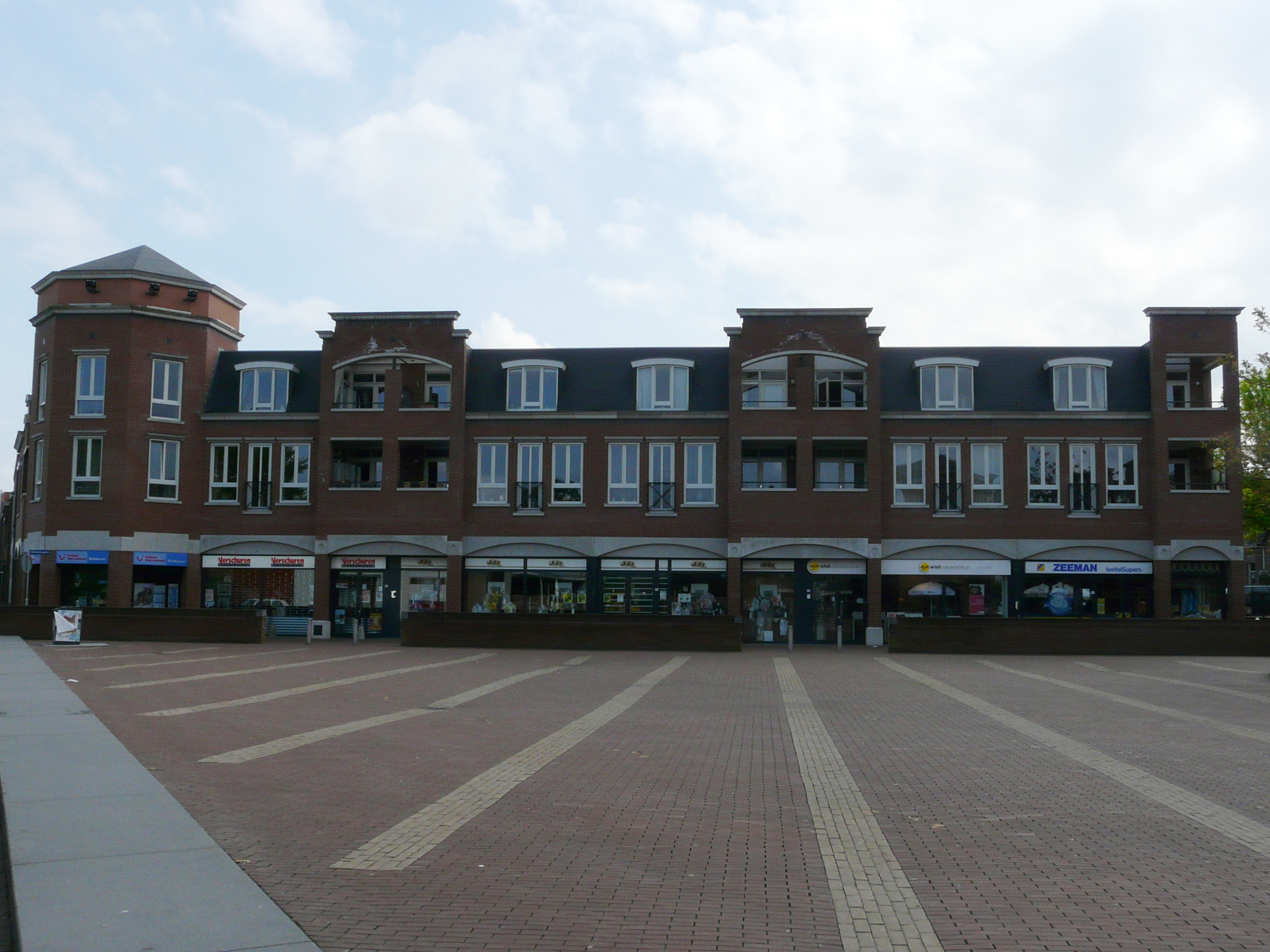
Shopping street

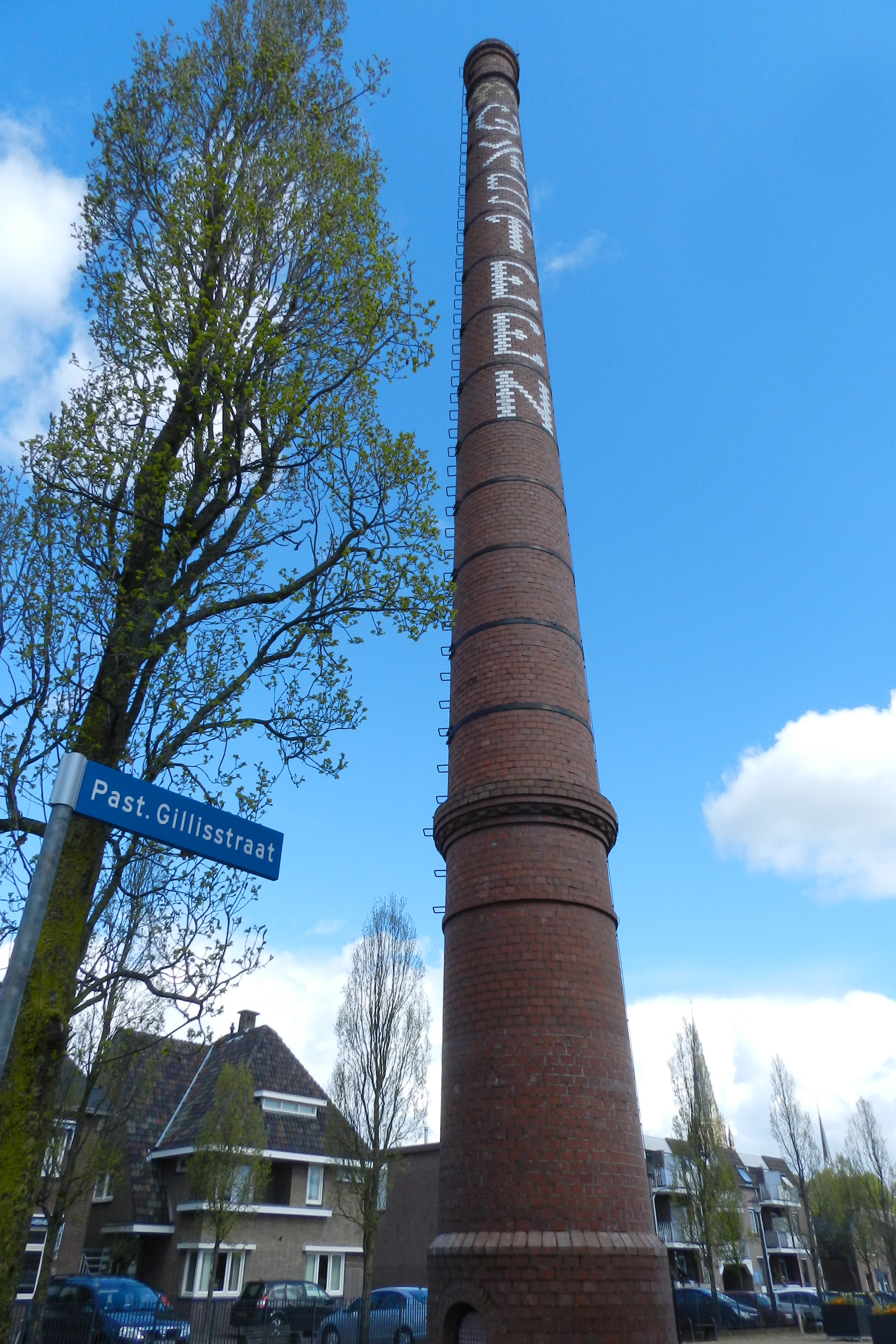
Chimney

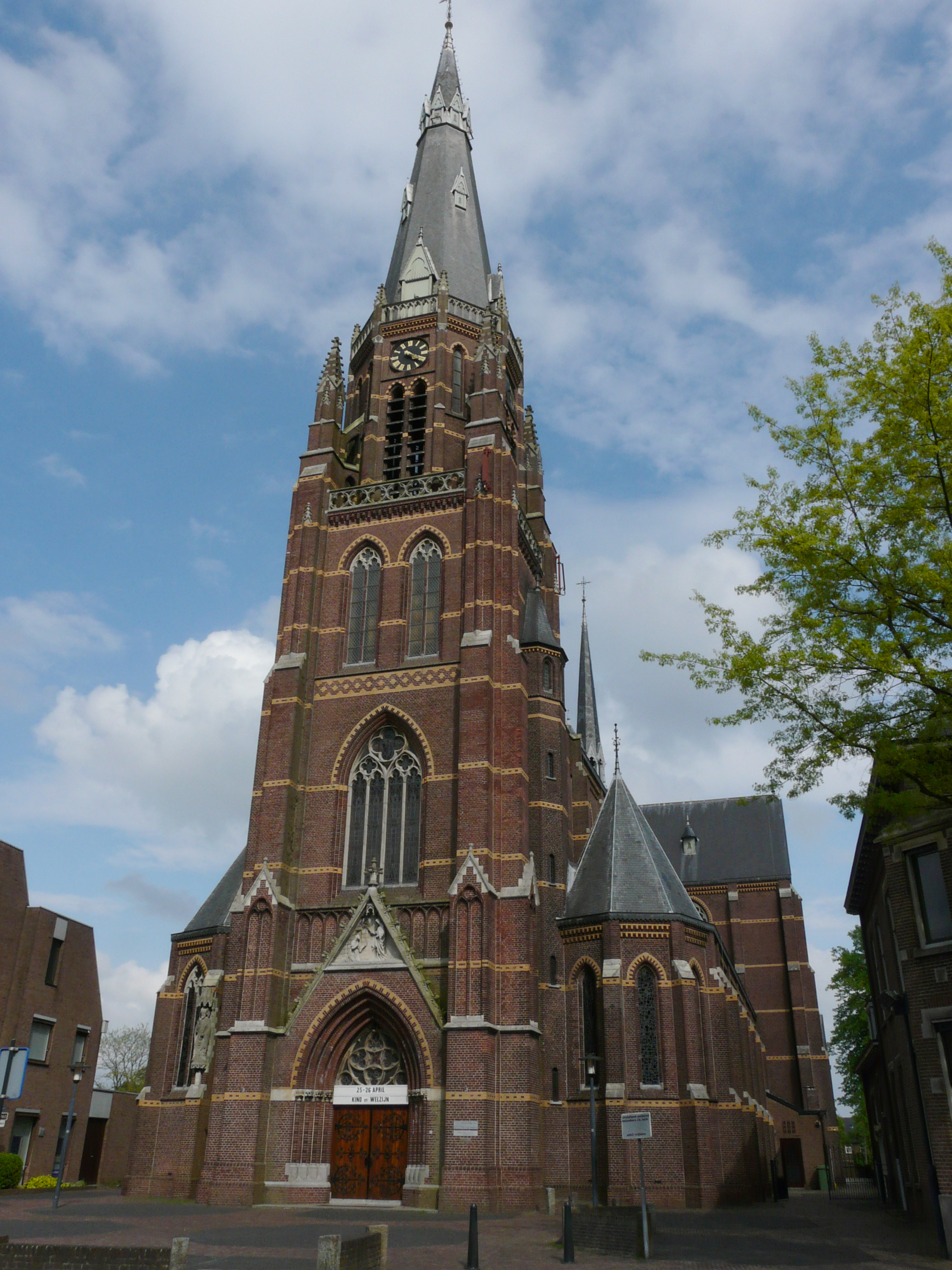
Maria Magdelena Church
