= Theo Bemelmans =

Dutch computer scientist

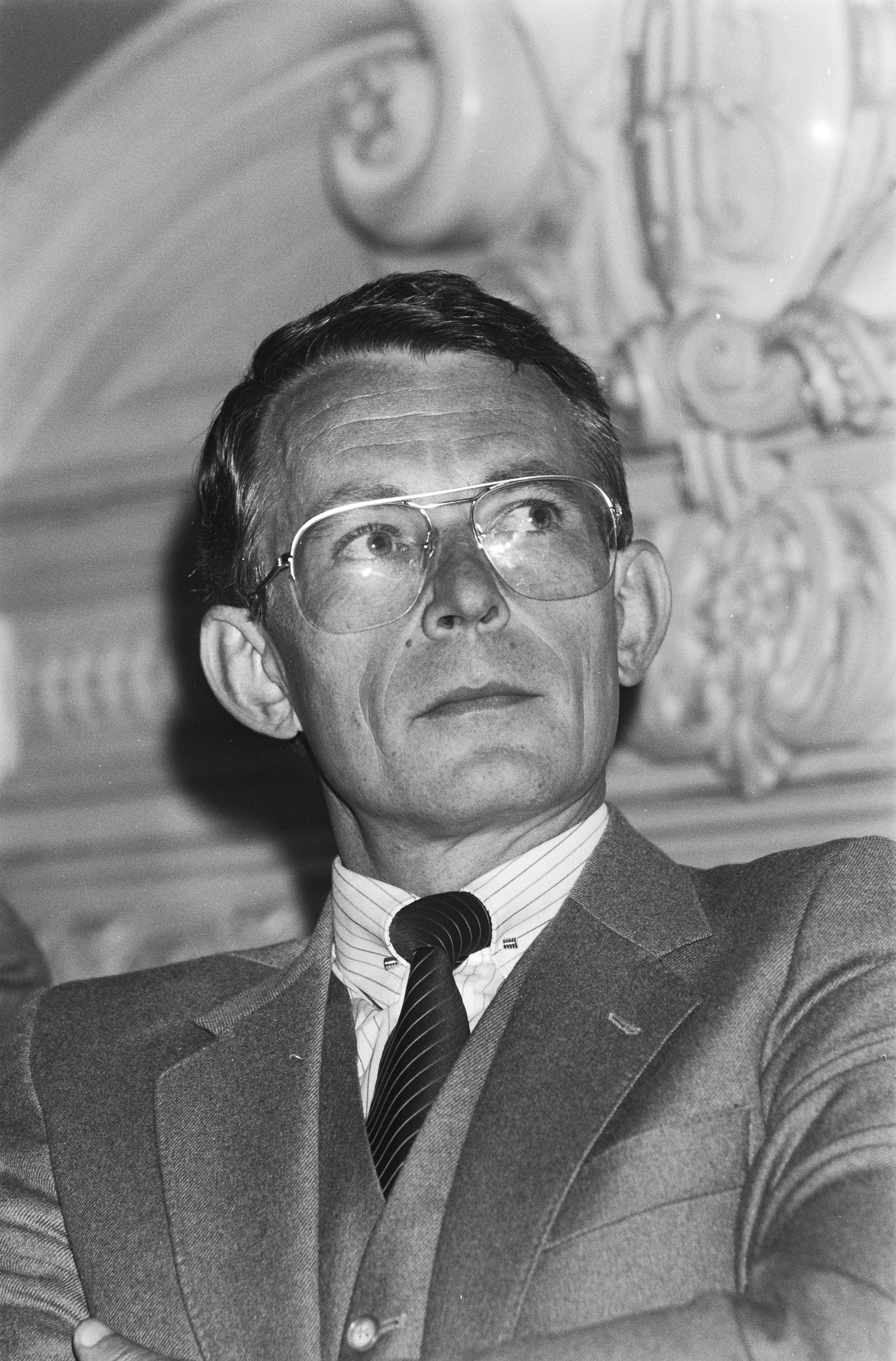
Prof. Bemelmans, 1984.

Theodore Aloysius Maria (Theo) Bemelmans (born 24 February 1943) is a Dutch computer scientist and Emeritus Professor of Administrative Information Systems and Automation at the Eindhoven University of Technology.

== Biography ==
Born in Heerlen, Bemelmans in 1962 started to study Econometrics at the Tilburg University, where he received his MA in 1968. Later in 1976 there he also received his PhD with a thesis entitled "Researchplanning in de Onderneming" (Research Planning in the Company) under supervision of Piet A. Verheyen and Wim van Hulst.

In 1968 Bemelmans started his academic career as faculty member at the Department of Business economics of the Tilburg University. From 1973 to 1978 he worked in the industry at Océ in Venlo, initially as information manager, later as comptroller in the management team of the division Drawing Office. Since 1978 he is employed at the Technical University of Eindhoven, first as a lecturer and later until March 1, 2004 as Professor of Accounting Information Systems and Automation at the Faculty of Technology Management. Since his retirement he is part-time associated to the Stichting Het Expertisecentrum in The Hague.

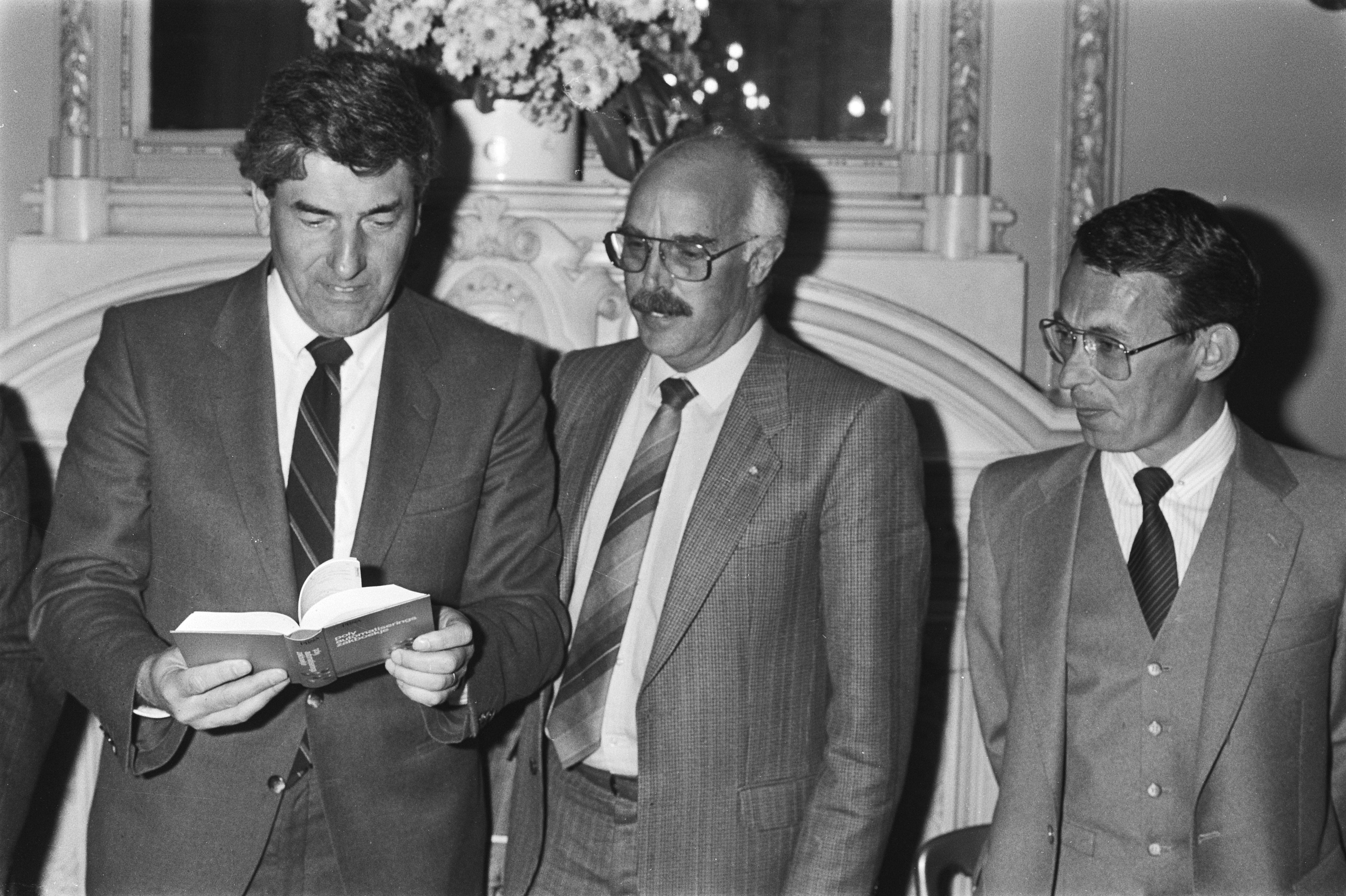
Prime Minister Ruud Lubbers receives Poly-automatiserings-Zakboekje (Poly automation Pocket Book) PBNA, left to right Lubbers, PBNA director Weusten and compiler prof. Bemelmans, 1984.

Bemelmans held numerous executive positions, both inside and outside the university. In 1978 he founded the Department of Strategic Information Systems and Automation. Later he was vice-dean and dean of the Faculty of Industrial Engineering, Technology management, where he co-founded the study of Informatics at the Eindhoven University of Technology. He was scientific director of the Institute for Perception Research (IPO), and one of the founders of the design program "User System Interaction". He was also a board member of the Nederlands Genootschap voor Informatica (Dutch Society for Informatics), and board member of the Stichting Informatica Onderzoek Nederland (Science Research Foundation Netherlands). He was curator at the Mathematical Centre Amsterdam and at the Royal Military Academy in Breda.

From 1986 to 1995 Bemelmans has been part-time partner at Twijnstra Gudde. Since 2002 Bemelmans was involved in the Radboud Foundation, first as member and chairman of the Advisory Council for the scientific work, and later as member of the Executive Committee.

Bemelmans supervised more than thirty doctoral students, and was involved in many other promotions as a committee. Among his doctoral students were Eero Eloranta (1981), Jacques Theeuwes (1985), Jan Dietz (1987), Maarten Looijen (1988), Jan Grijpink (1999), and Rini van Solingen (2000). In 2004, in his farewell speech at the Eindhoven University of Technology Bemelmans was appointed Knight of the Order of Orange-Nassau.

== Work ==
Bemelmans' main areas of interest are information strategy and policy, methods for systems development, cost/benefit analysis, project management and quality of information .

=== Technical University of Eindhoven ===
Early 1970s the study of computer science at the Technical University of Eindhoven had been allocated in the Department of Mathematics chaired by Edsger Dijkstra. At the Department of Technology Management mid-1970s there was growing demand for lessons in informatics and automated data processing. These lesson were initially supplied by Gert Nielen from the Tilburg University.

In 1978 at the Department of Technology Management Bemelmans was nominated among others by Nielen and Verrijn Stuart as lecturer in business economics, and particularly administrative information systems and automation. In his 1978 inaugural speech he defined the foundations of his research and education in "operations research, organizational science and informatics."

=== Management Information and Automation ===
Bemelmans in 1982 published the book "Bestuurlijke informatiesystemen en automatisering" (Management Information and Automation) which presented an overview of the field, and became a seminal work in the Netherlands.

=== The Waiter strategy ===
One of the approaches for information analysis presented in Bemelman's 1982 book, is the in Dutch so-called "Ober strategie" (translated: Waiter strategy). This is one of four strategies for determining the information requirements:

- Waiter strategy: ask directly what kind of information user needs
- Reference strategy : Derive the information from existing information systems
- Development strategy : obtaining the required information by analysis of the users
- Evolutionary strategy : discover the information by experimenting with an evolving information system.

The idea of the Waiter strategy is that the analyst, like a waiter, directly ask the managers, what information he wants to have. A common misunderstanding in this strategy is, that is works with the assumption that managers can exactly indicate the information they need. This is often not the case. Other disadvantages of this method are:

- It determined the status quo without taking into account possible changes in the information.
- It provides a large amount of information in which structure is difficult to detect, and
- Users tend to indicate the information needs with too much focus on recent problems, rather than focussing on the 'bigger picture'.

=== Reference Models ===
Designing and building information systems be accelerated by starting from existing ideas about how a particular organization works, how the business therein, which are used and what functionality is required. Bemelmans therefore developed a limited classification of types of organizations:

- Companies without physical conversion process
- Companies with a physical transformation process (manufacturing companies) with a homogeneous mass, heterogeneous mass or piece-piece and series production
- Agricultural and extractive industries
- Service companies
- Financial institutions

Each type has its own organization specific information requirements, depending on the nature of the primary transformation system.

Bemelmans further states that one a comprehensive set of functional requirements can not think that applies to all types of organizations. One can indeed some "body system" as standard agree, then each individual organization based on that trunk system can develop its own information system.

=== Information and communication ===
In his farewell speech "Inform and communicate" in 2004, Bemelmans, that information in the course of the years in terms of emphasis shifted to communication systems, intended to support various forms of cooperation. However, cooperation is difficult, even in the information sphere. Critical factors here are the success and failure in this area, the realistic test whether or not a project is a bridge too far, and the question of what ICT actually has to offer in various partnerships within and between organizations?

== Publications ==
Bemelmans wrote several books and numerous articles. A selection:

- 1976. Researchplanning in de onderneming
- 1982. Bestuurlijke informatiesystemen en automatisering
- 1984. Beyond productivity : information systems development for organizational effectiveness : proceedings of the IFIP WG 8.2 Working Conference on Beyond Productivity : information systems development for organizational effectiveness, Minneapolis, Minnesota, U.S.A., 22–24 August 1983. Bemelmans (ed.) North-Holland. 1984.
- 1984. Poly automatiserings zakboekje
- 1996. Schakeringen in de bedrijfseconometrie : opstellen aangeboden aan prof. dr. P.A. Verheyen bij gelegenheid van zijn afscheid als hoogleraar in de bedrijfseconometrie aan de Katholieke Universiteit Brabant te Tilburg op 22 november 1996. With Wim van Hulst (eds).

Articles, a selection:

- Pijpers, G. G., Bemelmans, T., Heemstra, F. J., & van Montfort, K. A. (2001). Senior executives' use of information technology. Information and Software Technology, 43(15), 959-971.
- Rutkowski, A. F., Vogel, D. R., Van Genuchten, M., Bemelmans, T. M., & Favier, M. (2002). E-collaboration: The reality of virtuality. Professional Communication, IEEE Transactions on, 45(4), 219-230.
- Balla, K., Bemelmans, T., Kusters, R., & Trienekens, J. (2001). Quality through managed improvement and measurement (QMIM): Towards a phased development and implementation of a quality management system for a software company. Software Quality Journal, 9(3), 177-193.
