= Piet A. Verheyen =

Dutch economist (1931–2021)

Petrus Antonius Verheyen (14 November 1931 – 2 June 2021) was a Dutch economist and academic who was Emeritus Professor of Econometrics at the Tilburg University.

== Biography ==
Petrus Antonius Verheyen was born in Alphen, North Brabant on 14 November 1931. He received his Ph.D. in 1962 from the Tilburg University with a thesis entitled "Economie en techniek : beschouwingen over de technische coëfficiënten, de groeifactor en het kapitaalrendement in de theoretische economie" under supervision of Dirk B.J. Schouten.

In 1963 Verheyen was appointed Professor at the Tilburg University, Department of Economics. He had a special interest in the application of computers in business, and with Max Euwe and Jan Willem van Belkum published the 1968 book "Computer en onderneming". Among his doctoral students were Wim van Hulst (1973), Theo Bemelmans (1976)and Arnoud Boot (1987). Verheyen was dean of the Tilburg School of Economics, member (twice) and president of Tilburg University. In 1989 he retired from the Tilburg University.

Verheyen died in Tilburg on 2 June 2021, at the age of 89.

== Publications ==
Books, a selection:

- 1962. Economie en techniek : beschouwingen over de technische coëfficiënten, de groeifactor en het kapitaalrendement in de theoretische economie. Proefschrift Tilburg. Tilburg : Katholieke Hogeschool.
- 1968. Computer en onderneming. With Max Euwe and Jan Willem van Belkum. Alphen aan den Rijn : Samsom.
- 1984. De praktijk van de econometrie : opstellen door Tilburgse econometristen. Eds. Leiden : Stenfert Kroese.
- 1989. Dynamic policy games in economics : essays in honour of Piet Verheyen. Frederick van der Ploeg and Aart de Zeeuw eds. Amsterdam : North-Holland.
- 1996. Schakeringen in de bedrijfseconometrie : opstellen aangeboden aan prof. dr. P.A. Verheyen bij gelegenheid van zijn afscheid als hoogleraar in de bedrijfseconometrie aan de Katholieke Universiteit Brabant te Tilburg op 22 november 1996. With T.M.A. Bemelmans and Wim van Hulst (eds).
- 1997. Financiering en macht : van financiële structuur tot beheersstructuur. With Arnoud W.A. Boot. Deventer : Kluwer BedrijfsInformatie.
