= John Rijsman =

Dutch-Belgian psychologist (born 1944)

John B. Rijsman (born 1944) is a Belgian social psychologist and Professor of Social Psychology at the Tilburg University, known for his work on health and education, particularly on the "dynamics of social competition in personal and categorical comparison-situations."

Rijsman received his degrees and his PhD from the Katholieke Universiteit Leuven. After his graduation he obtained an appointed at the University of Illinois for a short period. In 1972 he returned to The Netherlands, where he was appointed Professor at the Tilburg University. For some years he has been Dean of the educational program on psychology of the University. He has supervised the dissertations of more than 100 PhD students, and among them was Hans Strikwerda. Rijsman was editor-in-chief of the European Journal of Social Psychology, and Associate Editor of the European Journal of Psychology. In the 1990s he crossed path with Kenneth Gergen, and joined the Taos Institute.

== Publications ==
- Orhan, Mehmet A.; Rijsman, John B.; van Dijk, Gerda M. (2016). "Invisible, therefore isolated: Comparative effects of team virtuality with task virtuality on workplace isolation and work outcomes" Journal of Work and Organizational Psychology 32 (2), 109–122.
- Martinez, L.M.; Zeelenberg, M.; Rijsman, John B. (2011). "Regret, disappointment and the endowment effect" Journal of Economic Psychology 32 (6), 962–968.
- Martinez, L.M.; Zeelenberg, M.; Rijsman, John B. (2011). "Behavioural consequences of regret and disappointment in social bargaining games" Cognition and Emotion, 25(2), 351–359.
- Martinez, L.M.; Zeelenberg, M.; Rijsman, John B. (2011). "Why valence is not enough in the study of emotions: Behavioral differences between regret and disappointment" Psicologia 22(2), 109–121.
- Rutkowski, Anne-Françoise; Rijsman, John B.; Gergen, Mary (2004). "Paradoxical Laughter at a Victim as Communication with a Non-victim". International Review of Social Psychology 17 (4): 5–11
- Rijsman, John. Social Comparison as Social Construction: Theory and Illustration. Université de Neuchâtel Faculté des Lettres et des sciences humaines, Institut de psychologie et éducation, 2008.
- Rijsman, J. "The dynamics of social competition in personal and categorical comparison-situations." Current issues in European social psychology 1 (1983): 279–312.
- Rijsman, John, and Wolfgang Stroebe. "The two social psychologies or whatever happened to the crisis?." European journal of social psychology 19.5 (1989): 339–343.
- Rijsman, John B. "Social diversity: A social psychological analysis and some implications for groups and organizations." European Journal of Work and Organizational Psychology 6.2 (1997): 139–152.
