= Nick Leijten =

Dutch footballer

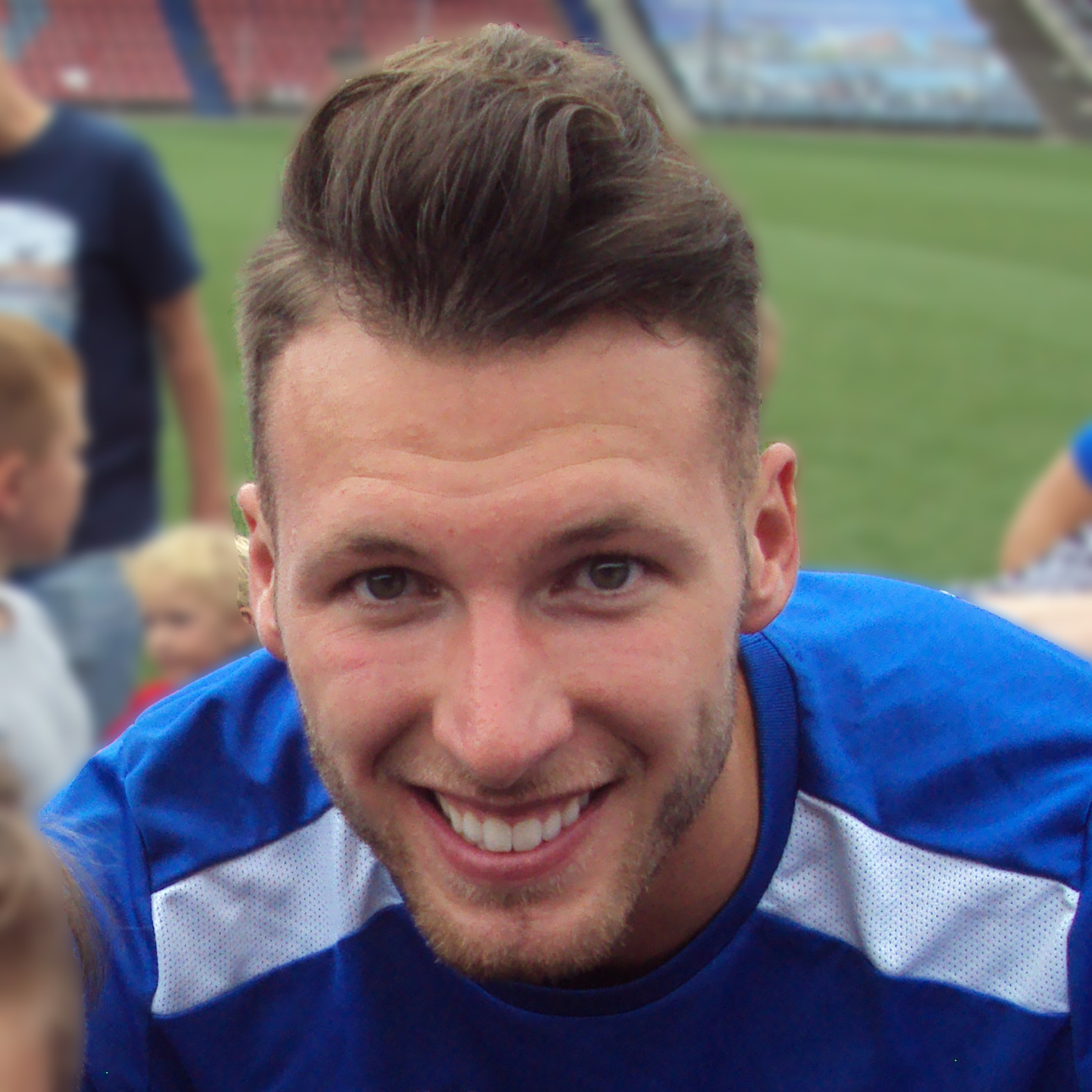
- Leijten with Den Bosch in 2016

Personal information
- Date of birth: 20 September 1991 (age 35)
- Place of birth: Geffen, Netherlands
- Height: 1.91 m (6 ft 3 in)
- Position: Goalkeeper

Youth career
- Nooit Gedacht
- 2001–2005: Den Bosch
- 2005–2009: HVCH

Senior career*
Years	Team	Apps	(Gls)
2009–2013	HVCH		
2013–2016	DESO		
2016–2020	Den Bosch	17	(0)
2020–2021	TEC	3	(0)
- * Club domestic league appearances and goals

Nick Leijten (born 20 September 1991) is a Dutch former footballer who played as a goalkeeper.

== Club career ==
In 2016, Leijten moved from DESO from Oss to second-tier Eerste Divisie club FC Den Bosch, where he signed a contract until 30 June 2017, with an option to extend until 2019. He made his professional debut in the Den Bosch on 23 September 2016 in a game against FC Emmen. In this match he replaced Kees Heemskerk after 8 minutes with a head injury. Den Bosch triggered the option in Leijten's contract on 31 March 2017 and secured his services until mid-2019.

In mid-2020 he moved to TEC in the Tweede Divisie. Leijten retired from football in January 2021 to focus on his family and his work as a plasterer.
