= Henriette van Lynden-Leijten =

Dutch diplomat

Henriette Johanna Cornelia Maria Barones van Lynden-Leijten (9 October 1950, Gilze en Rijen – 5 November 2010, Sint Oedenrode) was a Dutch diplomat.

Baroness Van Lynden-Leijten was the Dutch ambassador to Bulgaria from 2001 to 2005 and ambassador to the Vatican from 2009 to 2010. She died of cancer in 2010, aged 60.
