= Shared services center =

Entity responsible for the execution and the handling of specific operational tasks

TeliaSonera shared service center in Vilnius, Lithuania

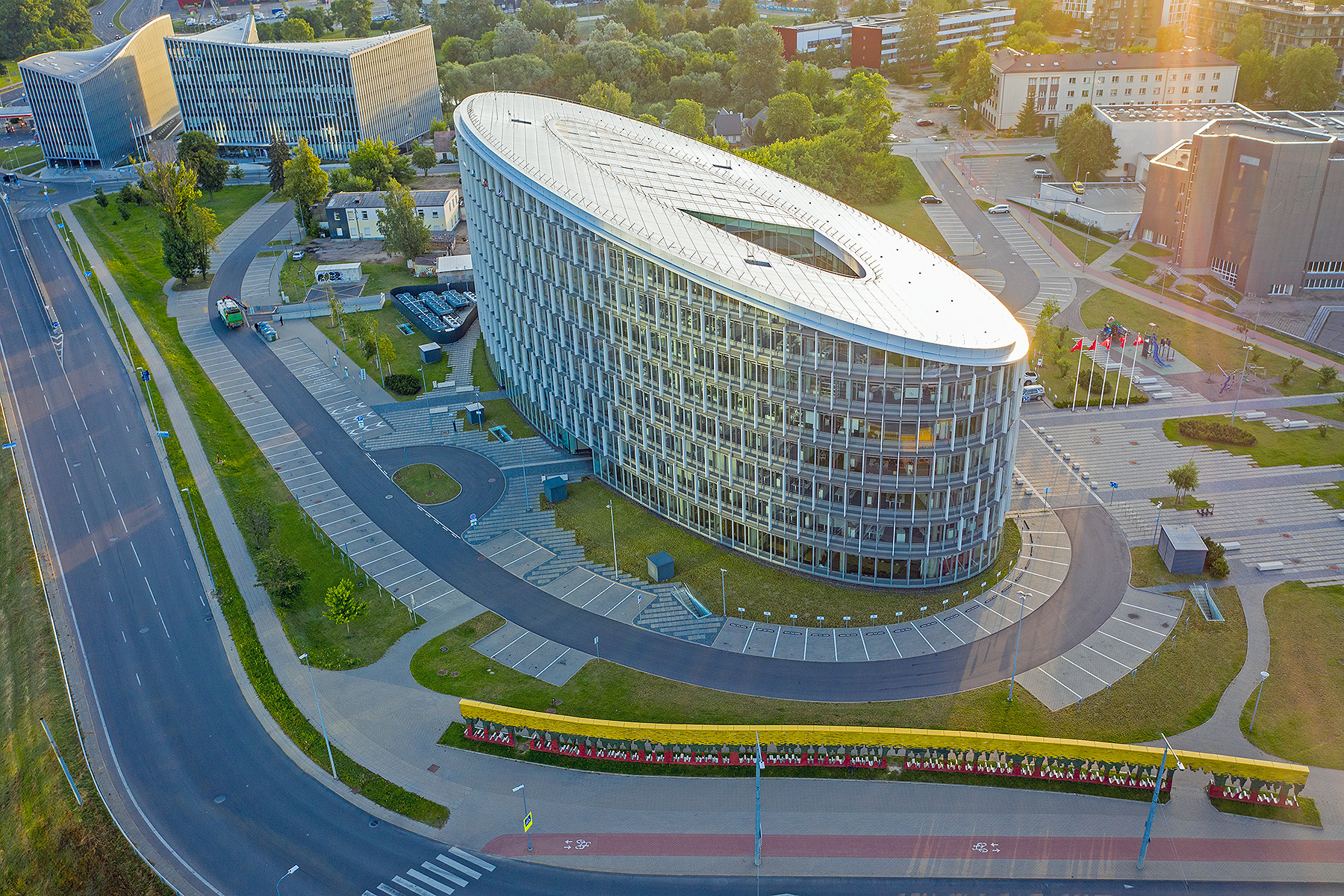
Nasdaq shared services center in Vilnius, Lithuania

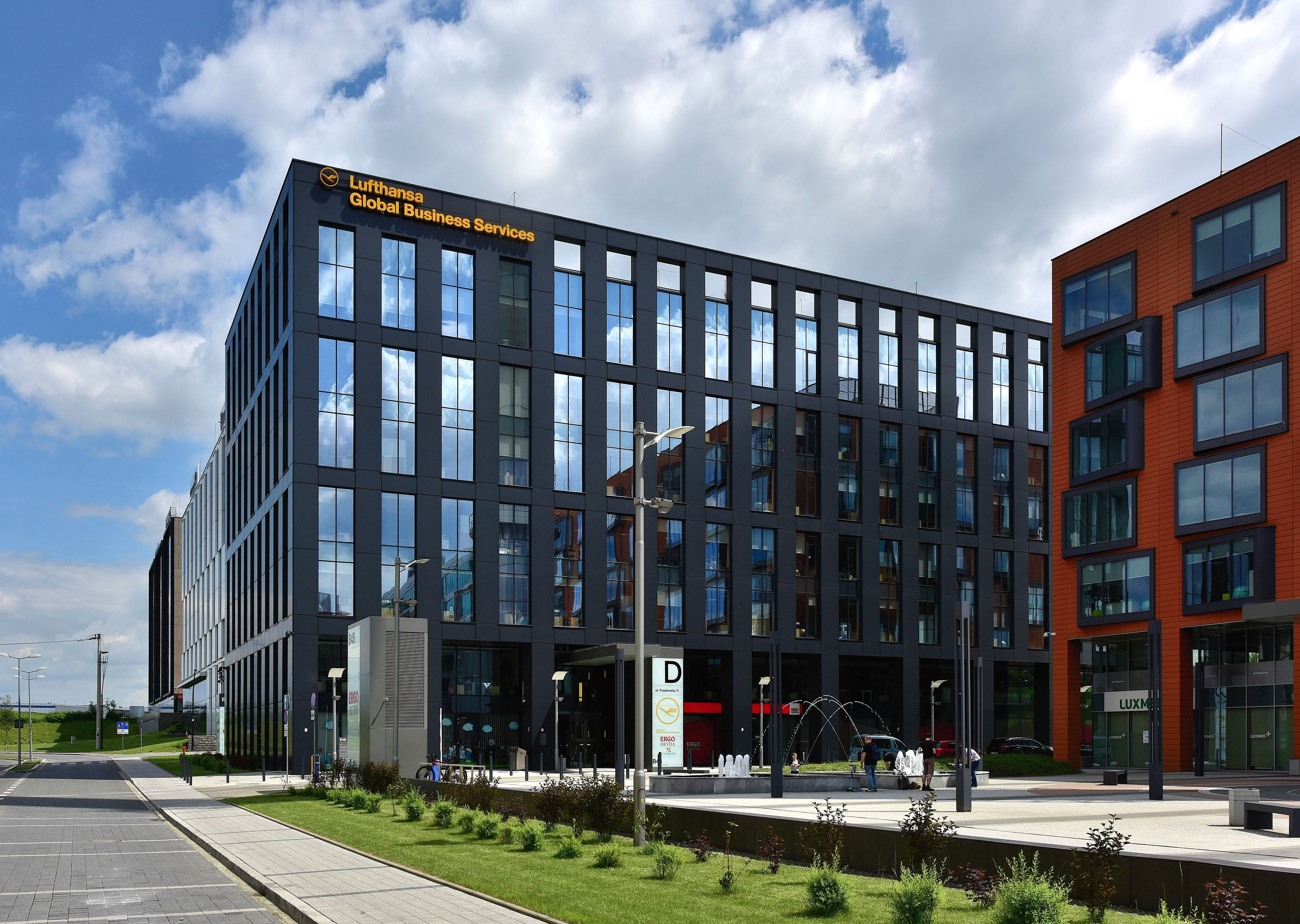
Lufthansa shared services centre in Kraków, Poland

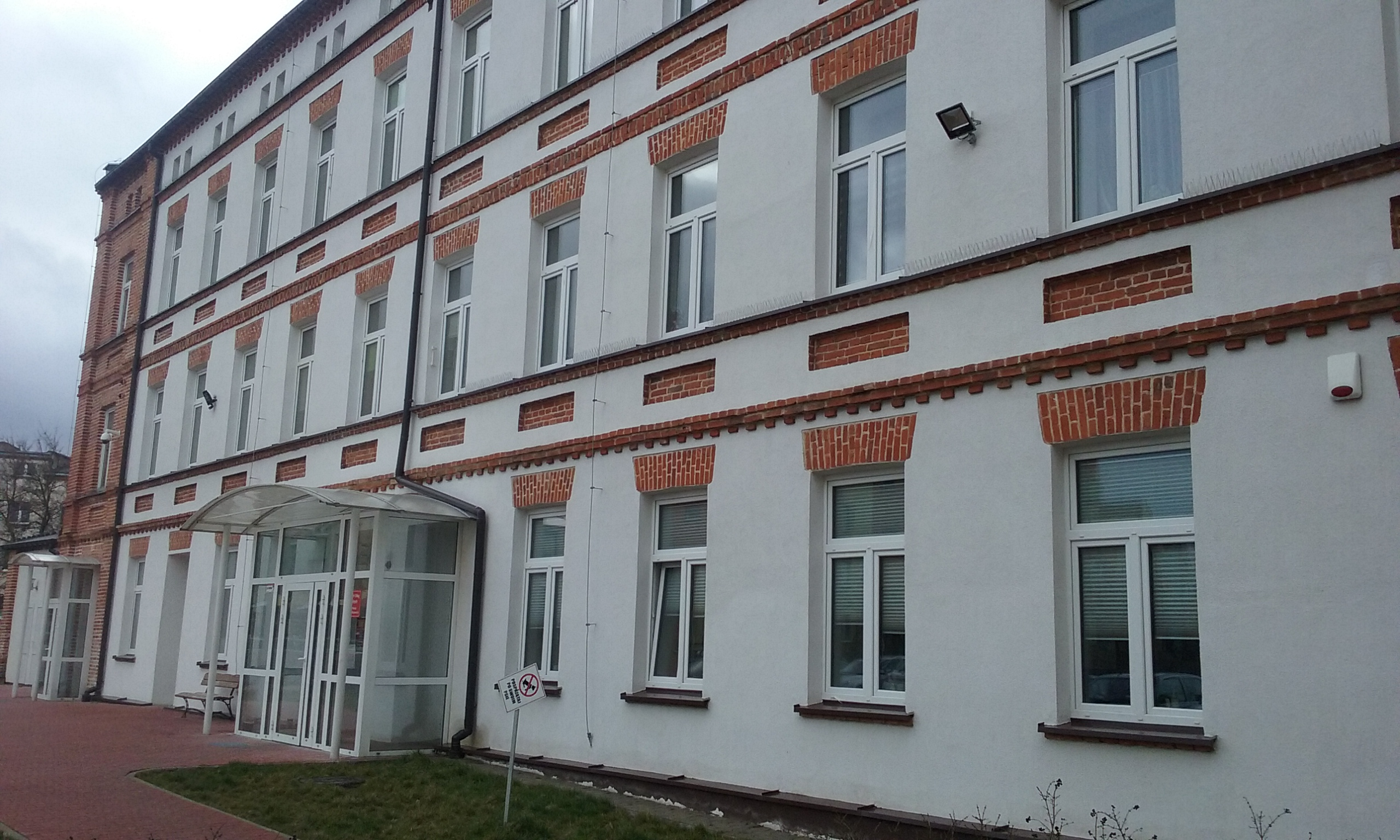
Shared services center of local government in Tomaszów Mazowiecki, Poland

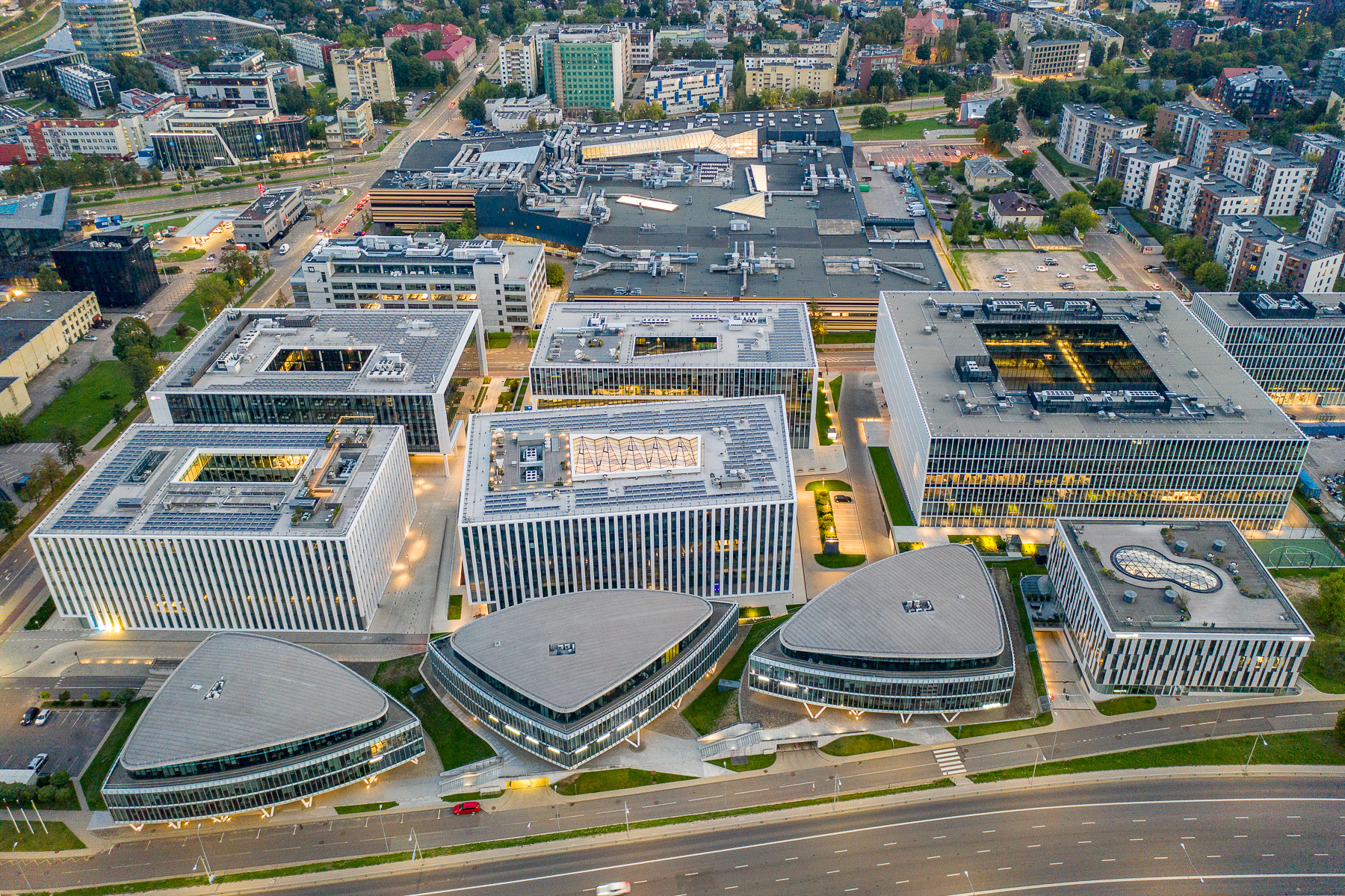
Danske Bank campus – a large shared services center in Vilnius, Lithuania

A shared services center – a center for shared services in an organization – is the entity responsible for the execution and the handling of specific operational tasks, such as accounting, human resources, payroll, IT, legal, compliance, purchasing, security. The shared services center is often a spin-off of the corporate services to separate all operational types of tasks from the corporate headquarters, which has to focus on a leadership and corporate governance type of role. As shared services centers are often cost centers, they are quite cost-sensitive also in terms of their headcount, labour costs and location selection criteria.

== Overview ==
A shared service is an accountable entity within a multi-unit organization tasked with supplying the business unit, respective divisions and departments with specialized services (finance, HR transactions, IT services, facilities, logistics, sales transactions) on the basis of a service level agreement (SLA) with a costs charge out on basis of some type and system of transfer price.

Shared service centers are deployed for a variety of reasons:

- to reduce costs of decentralization, to increase the quality and professionalism of support processes for the business,
- to increase cost flexibility for supporting services,
- to create a higher degree of strategic flexibility.

Reported cost reductions of costs of services organized in shared service center are as high as 70% of the original costs, but average about 50%.

Shared service centers are not to be confused with corporate staff departments. Different from staff departments, shared service centers have measurable outputs (by quantity and quality), with costs per unit of service provided. Tasks not organized in shared service centers include corporate control, corporate legal, management development policy, IT-governance and other support typical for the statutory duties of the executive board.

Shared services training:

Many organizations in private and public sectors use a competency-based training course to identify and fill skill gaps.

== Critical issue ==
=== Specific requirements ===
To reap the benefits a multiple shared service centers sets specific requirements to the resource allocation process in the internal organization of the firm. A critical issue is that the manager of a business unit and the manager of a shared service center will prepare a service level agreement (SLA), but the approval of the SLA is a reserved power of the executive board. This is to balance the overall budget of the firm as well as to avoid budget gaming between the managers of the business unit and the shared service center.

A common mistake is to grant the shared service center a status equal to that of business unit or division. This creates confusion as it conflicts with the primacy of the units responsible for managing market opportunities. Also shared service centers should not report to their corresponding corporate staff department (with the exception of the financial shared service center) as this creates the risk that the corporate staff department uses the shared service centers to deploy functional authorities. Managers of business units will then perceive the shared service center as an implicit control device, impairing the quality of services.

It is equally important that deploying a shared service center in a multi-unit organization makes the executive board accountable to the managers of the business unit for the performance of the shared service centers. This is because the use of the services of the shared service centers is mandatory, the executive board reduces the scope of resources of the business units, whilst the accountability of the manager of the business unit for business performance remains unchanged.

=== Deployment ===
The deployment of shared service centers requires that the managers of the business units develop the competence to be a professional principal of the shared service, knowing how to articulate their demand and what value services have to their business.

In the accounting system a shared service usually will have the status of cost and investment center. As some shared-service centers, e.g. for purchasing and for customer service, dependent on their activities, actually perform value-creating activities, to the judgement of fiscal authorities, transborder transfer prices may be subject to taxation.

=== Cost charge ===
With respect to cost charge out a critical issue is that costs charged based on activity based costing (ABC) do not provide an incentive to the shared service center to be efficient because ABC implies that the costs of non-used over capacity will be charged out as well. It is better to cost charge out on time-driven activity based costing. The superior solution for cost charge out is cost allocation based on the deployment of a corporate wide general ledger, which includes the recording of the internal use of resources for products and customers. This method eliminates the effect of double marginalization inherent to transfer prices and subsequently improves the performance of the firm.

=== Standardized processes ===
Another critical issue in shared service centers is the way processes are standardized. At the end of the day shared service centers have to contribute to the competitiveness and the (financial) performance of the firm. As competition shifts to innovation of business models and in relation to this there is a higher dynamics in the composite customer value proposition to be performed, changes in the customer value proposition need to be translated timely and effectively in (back office) processes. As a consequence standardization of processes cannot be based on "best practice processes" as used to be promoted by IT (enterprise systems) but need to be based on basis of modularity.

=== Coordination of demand and supply ===
In practice the coordination of demand and supply of services between business units and shared service centers, as expressed in a SLA turns out not to be effective, this only serves a generic capacity planning. In sync with the shift in business firms from budget-driven strategy execution to strategy execution based on validated cause-effect diagrams, the specific performance of shared service centers needs to be defined through cause-effect relations, linking the customer value proposition to back-office processes and vice versa. In this way, beyond defining shared service centers as cost centers, the contribution of shared services centers to competitiveness and performance can be established and controlled. Also this is an enormous boost to the morale and motivation of workers in shared service centers.

== See also ==
- Offshoring
- Offshore development center
- Outsourcing
- Shared services
