= Michael Corbey =

Michael H. Corbey is a Dutch industrial engineer, management consultant, and Full Professor of Management Accounting and Control at TIAS School for Business and Society, Tilburg University. He is also the Academic Director of the TIAS Executive Master of Finance and Control (EMFC) / Register Controller (RC) postgraduate programs.

== Biography ==
Michael Corbey grew up in the vicinity of Roermond (Melick) and received an MSc (Eng) in Technology Management at Eindhoven University of Technology, and a PhD, also at Eindhoven University of Technology.

Corbey started his career working in industry and consultancy. In 1993 he returned to the academic world and became Assistant Professor at the Faculty of Economics of the Tilburg University. In 1997-98 he was Visiting faculty at the INSEAD Business School in Fontainebleau. In 1999 he was appointed Full Professor of Management Accounting and Control at Maastricht University and Director of the Register Controller program. In 2002 he was appointed Full Professor of Management Accounting and Control at TIAS School for Business and Society, Tilburg University.

Professor Corbey served as the Associate Dean of the TIAS Executive Master and Certificate Programs from 2009 until 2013. He was responsible for the NVAO accreditation of all TIAS MSc programs. When he stepped back, he received the TIAS lifetime achievement award.

Apart from his current teaching Management Accounting & Control in the postgraduate controlling programs, Professor Corbey also teaches in the TIAS part-time and Executive MBA programs and the Executive Master and Certificate Programs, e.g., the MMO, MOS, MMCM, Commissarissen en Toezichthouders Programma, and the Masterclass Financial Management.

As for company-specific programs, Professor Corbey has taught for organizations like ABN Amro, Alliander, Amphia, BDO, BNG, Bekaert, CSM, Royal Haskoning-DHV, Fortis, Fresenius, Fundis, ING, Interpolis, Kluwer, Lievense-CSO, Medisch Centrum Haaglanden, Marel, NanoNext, Nationale Nederlanden, NBA-VRC, NCD Nederlands Centrum voor Directeuren en Commisarissen, Nutreco, Océ, Rabobank, Randstad, Schuitema, SDWorx, SHV, SNS Reaal, Stork, Syngenta, Quint Wellington Redwood, and more.

He received the NCD best lecturer award in 2006, the ING Master of Marketing best teacher award in 2006, 2007, and 2008. He was elected TIAS Best Lecturer in 2006, 2007, 2010, 2017, 2022, and 2023.

== Publications ==
- Publications can be retrieved via Research Gate: https://www.researchgate.net/profile/Michael-Corbey-2
