= Old Summer Palace =

Former palace and garden complex in Beijing, China; destroyed in 1860

Coordinates: 40°00′26″N 116°17′33″E

Yuanmingyuan
- 圆明园 (Chinese); 圓明園 (Chinese)
- Old Summer Palace; Imperial Gardens
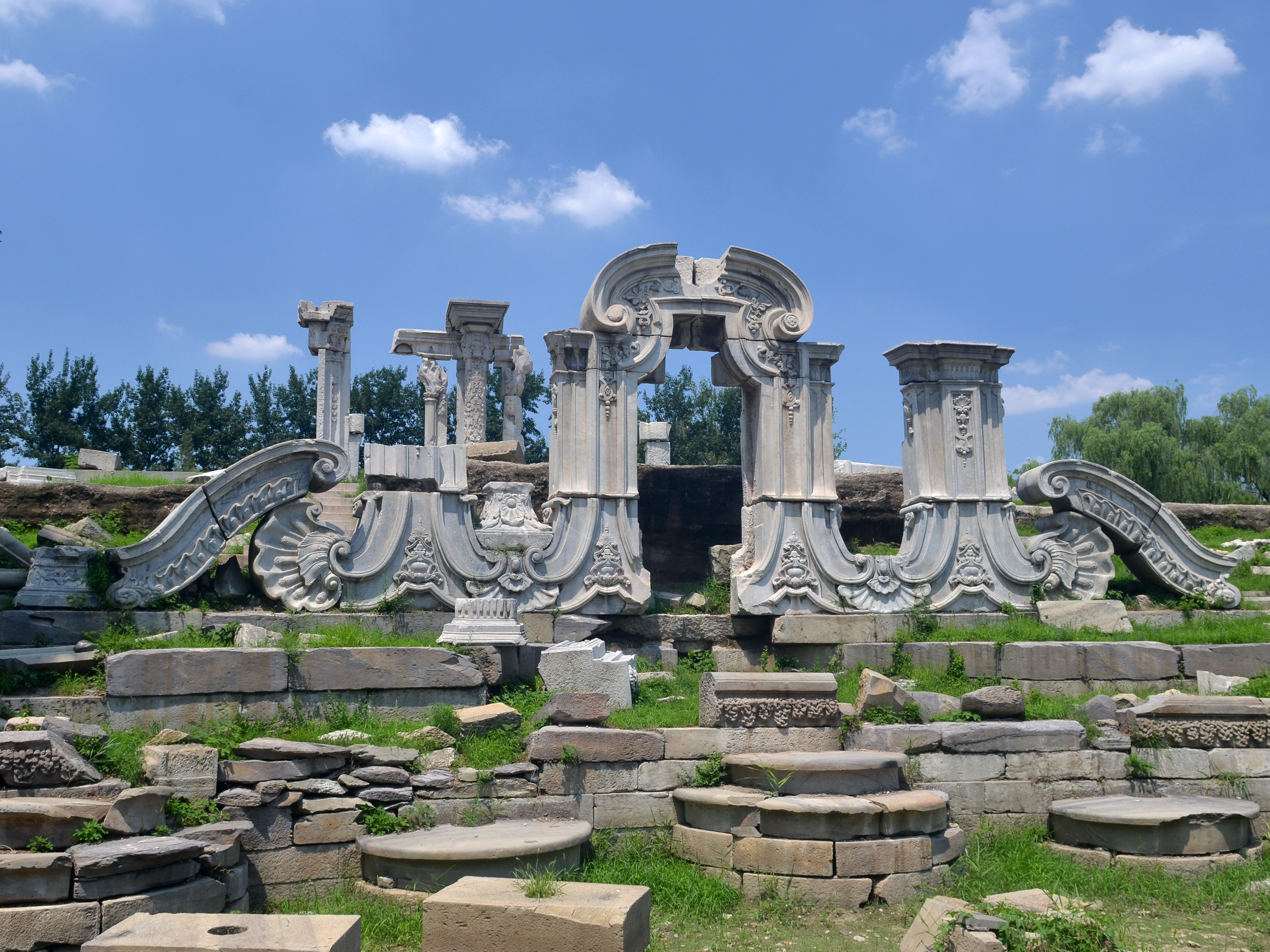
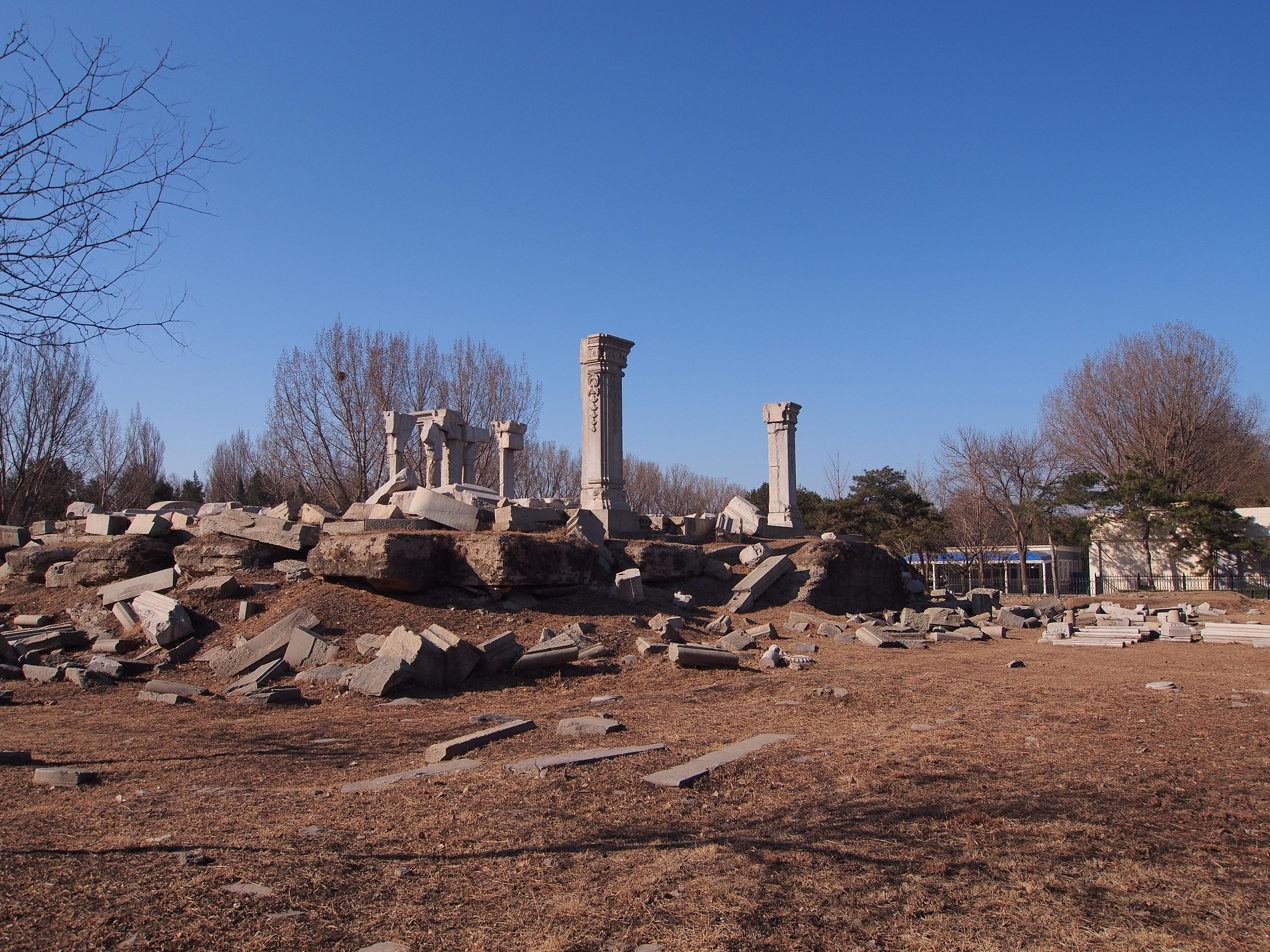
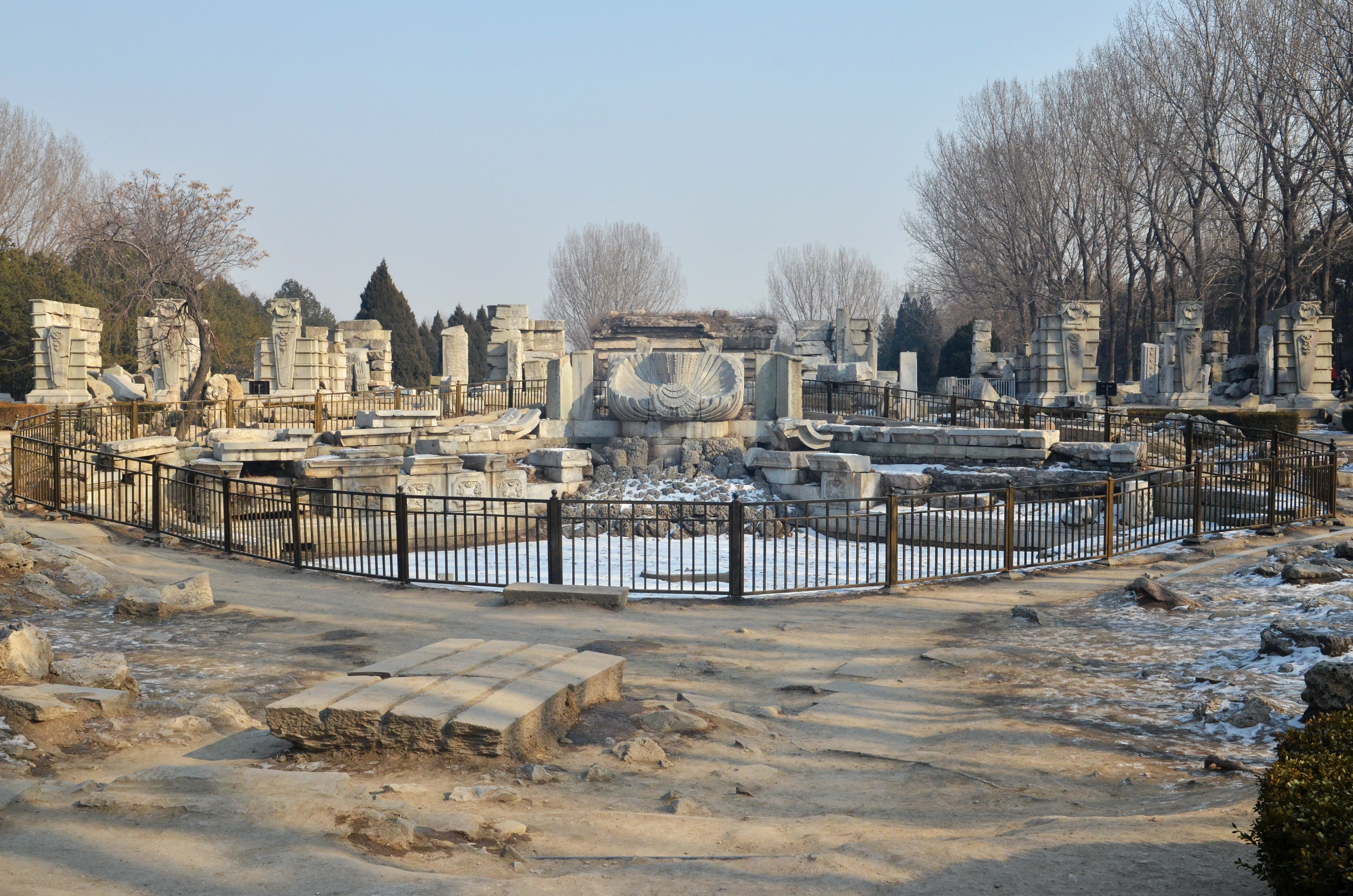
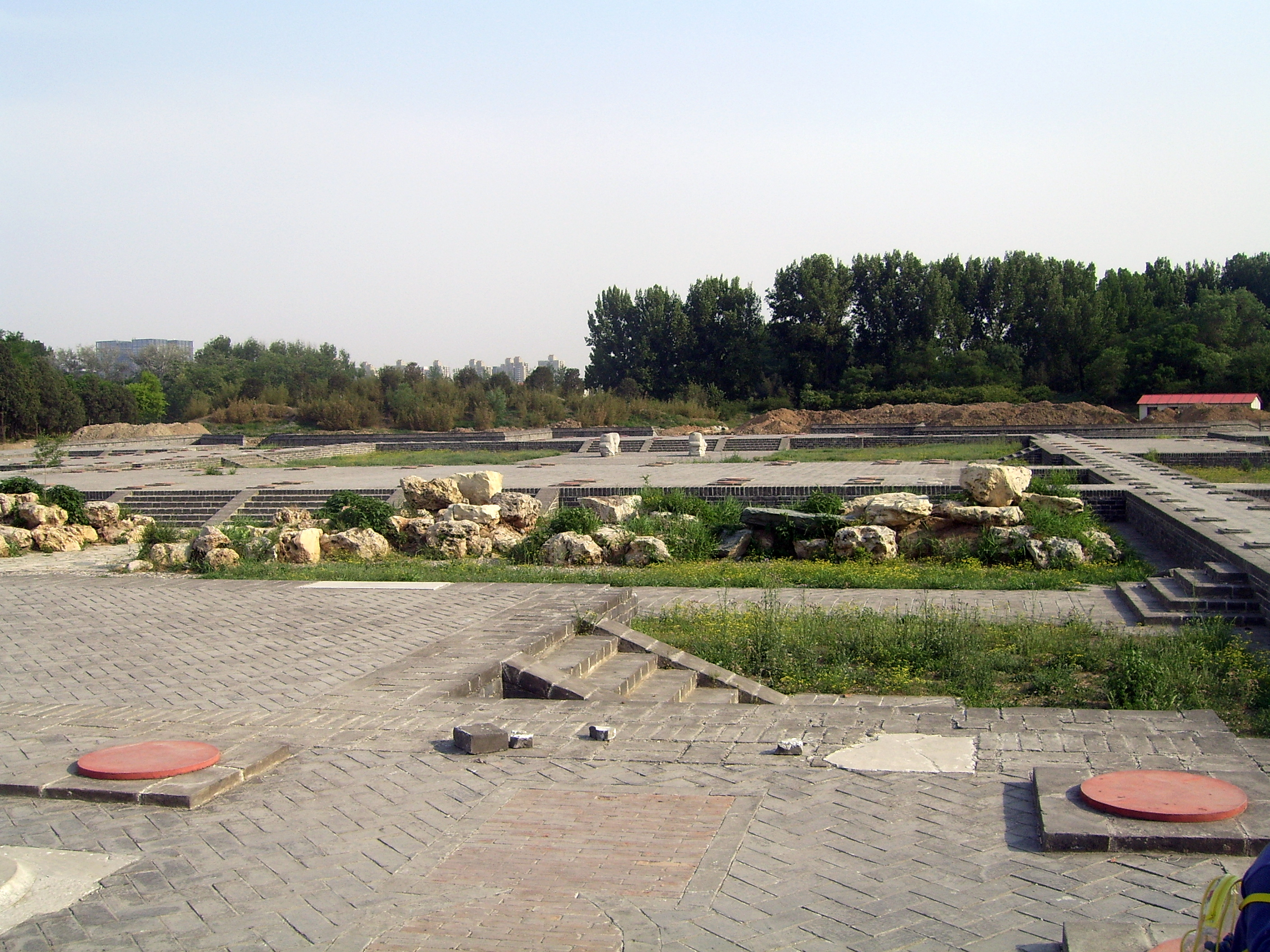
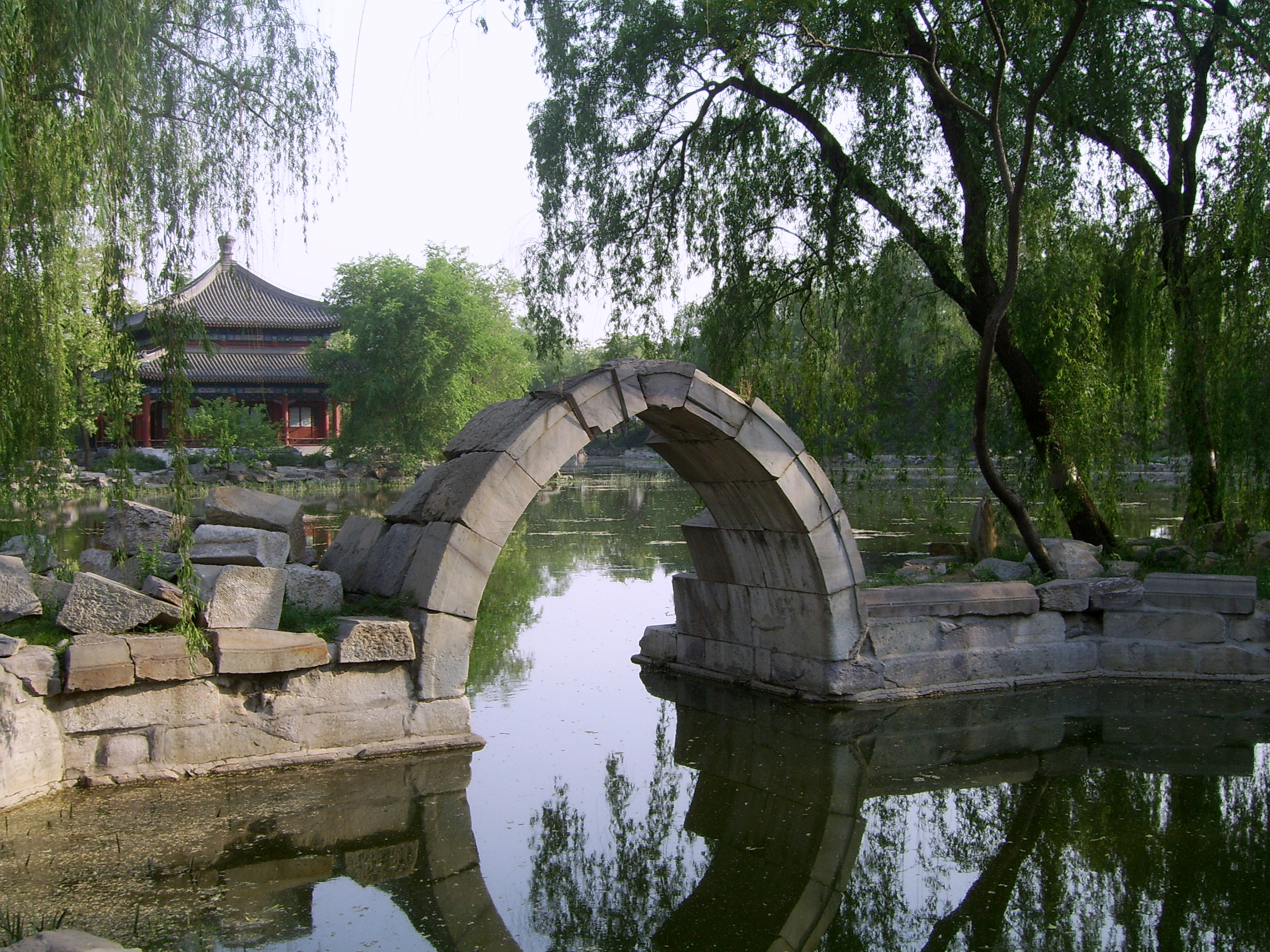
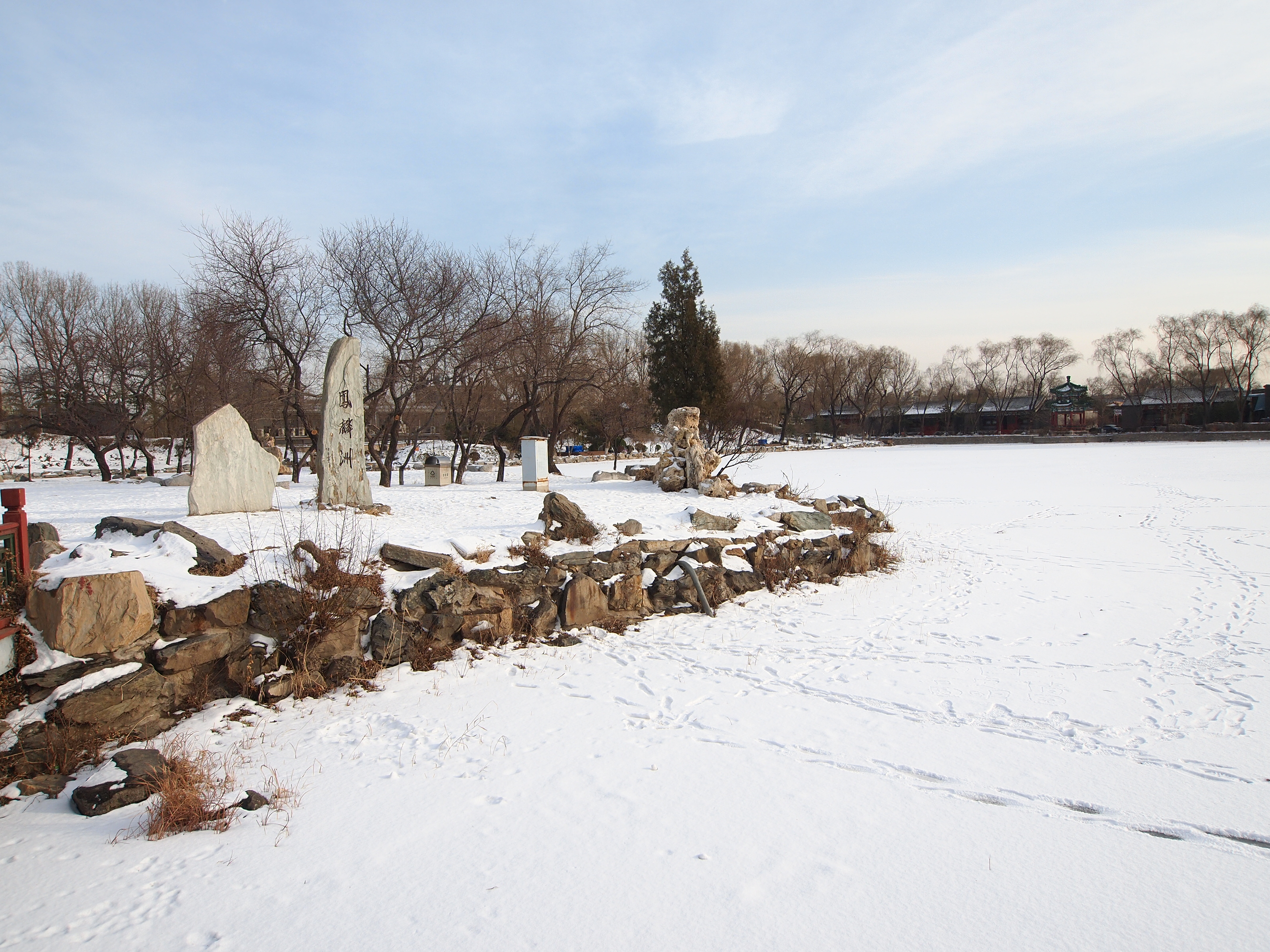
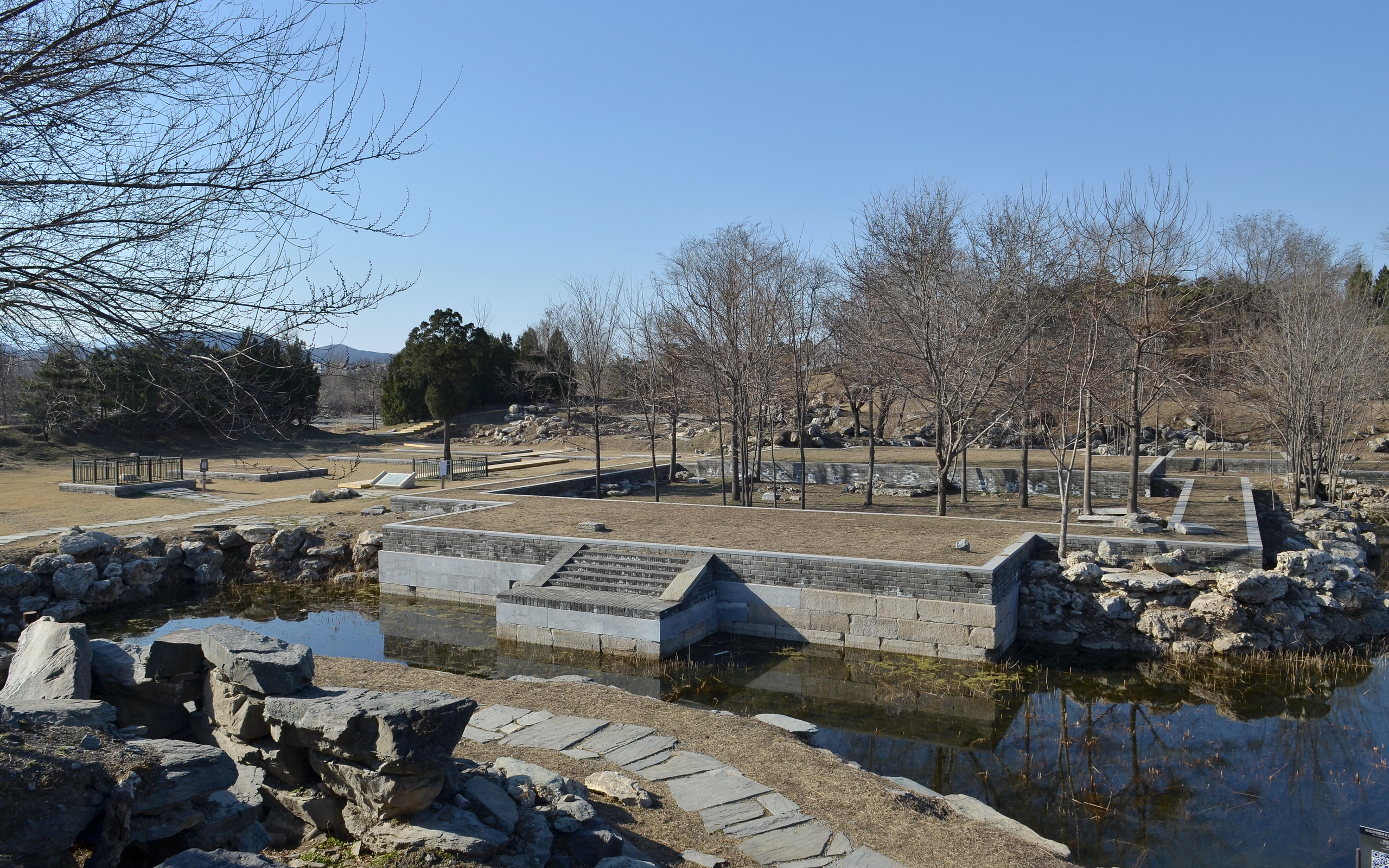
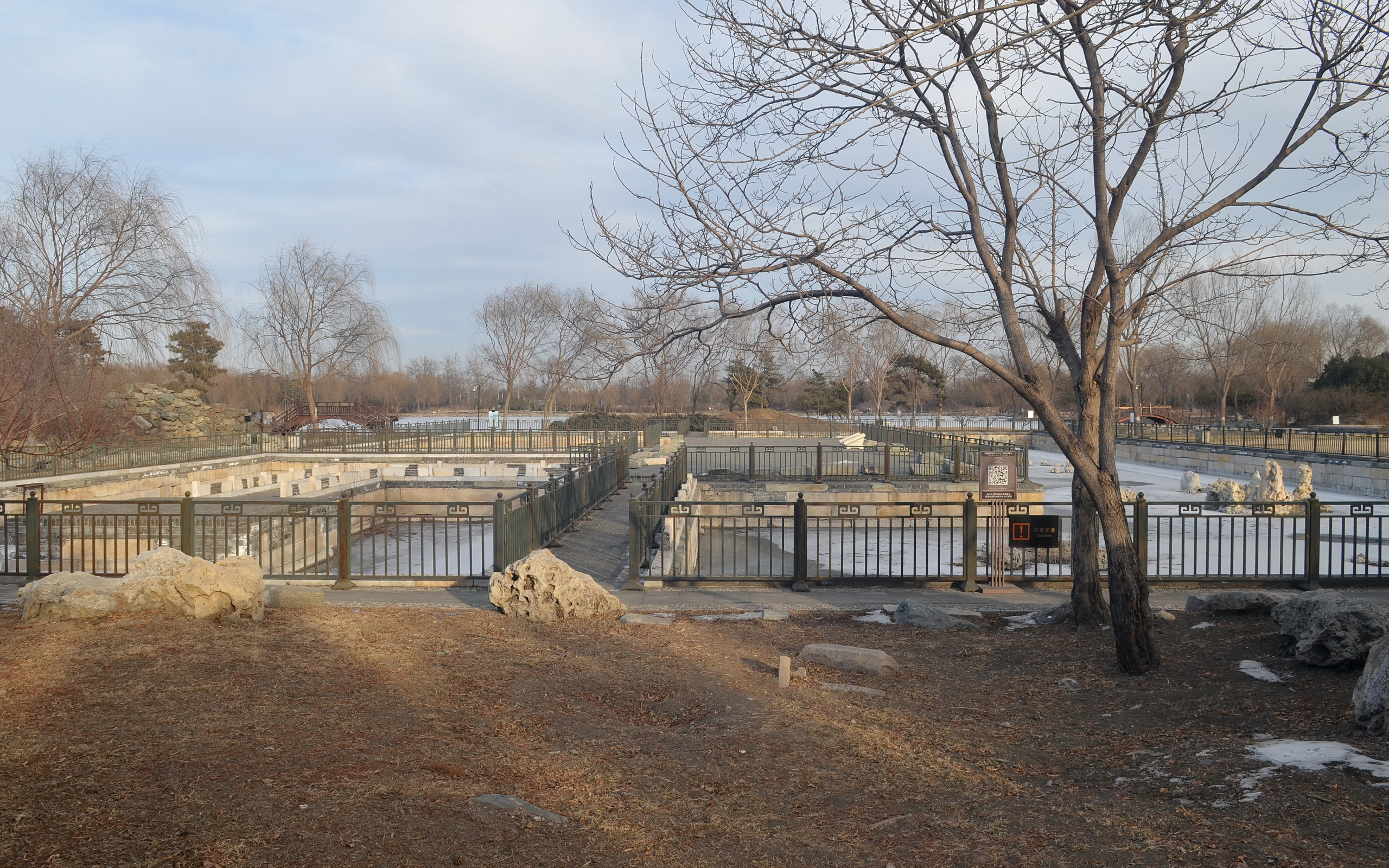
- Remains of the Old Summer Palace
- Interactive map of Yuanmingyuan
- Type: palace
- Location: Haidian District, Beijing, China

History
- Built: 1707
- Built for: Yongzheng Emperor
- Original use: Palace

Site notes
- Area: 350 ha (860 acres)
- Current use: Tourist attraction

Chinese name
- Simplified Chinese: 圆明园
- Traditional Chinese: 圓明園
- Literal meaning: Gardens of Perfect Brightness
Transcriptions
Standard Mandarin
- Hanyu Pinyin: Yuánmíng Yuán

Imperial Gardens
- Simplified Chinese: 御园
- Traditional Chinese: 御園
Transcriptions
Standard Mandarin
- Hanyu Pinyin: Yù Yuán

The Old Summer Palace, also known as Yuanmingyuan (traditional Chinese: 圓明園; simplified Chinese: 圆明园; pinyin: Yuánmíng Yuán; lit. 'Gardens of Perfect Brightness') or Yuanmingyuan Park, originally called the Imperial Gardens (traditional Chinese: 御園; simplified Chinese: 御园; pinyin: Yù Yuán), and sometimes called the Winter Palace, was a complex of palaces and gardens in present-day Haidian District, Beijing, China. It is 8 kilometres (5 mi) north-west of the walls of the former Imperial City section of Beijing. Widely perceived as the pinnacle work of Chinese imperial garden and palace design, the Old Summer Palace was known for its extensive collection of gardens, its building architecture and numerous art and historical treasures. Constructed throughout the 18th and early 19th centuries, the Old Summer Palace was the main imperial residence of the Qianlong Emperor of the Qing dynasty and his successors, and where they handled state affairs; the Forbidden City was used for formal ceremonies. The Garden was reputed as the "Garden of Gardens" (simplified Chinese: 万园之园; traditional Chinese: 萬園之園; pinyin: wàn yuán zhī yuán) in its heyday was "arguably the greatest concentration of historic treasures in the world, dating and representing a full 5,000 years of an ancient civilization", according to Stuart McGee, chaplain to the British forces.

During the Second Opium War, French and British troops captured the palace on 6 October 1860, looting and destroying the imperial collections over the next few days. As news emerged that an Anglo-French delegation had been imprisoned by the Qing government, with 19 delegation members being sentenced to death, the 8th Earl of Elgin, the British High Commissioner to China, retaliated by ordering the complete destruction of the palace on 18 October, which was then carried out by troops under his command. The palace was so large—covering more than 3.5 square kilometres (860 acres)—that it took 4,000 men and three days to destroy it. Many exquisite artworks – sculptures, porcelain, jade, silk robes, elaborate textiles, gold objects and more – were looted and, according to UNESCO, are now located in 47 museums around the world.

== Overview ==
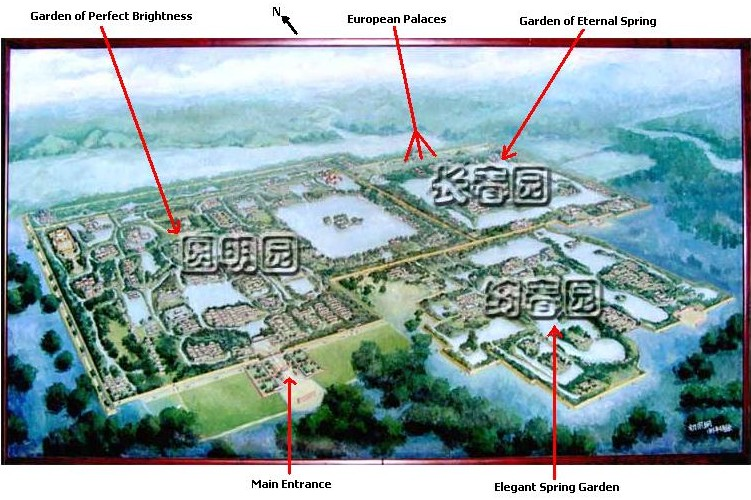
The Imperial Gardens as they once stood

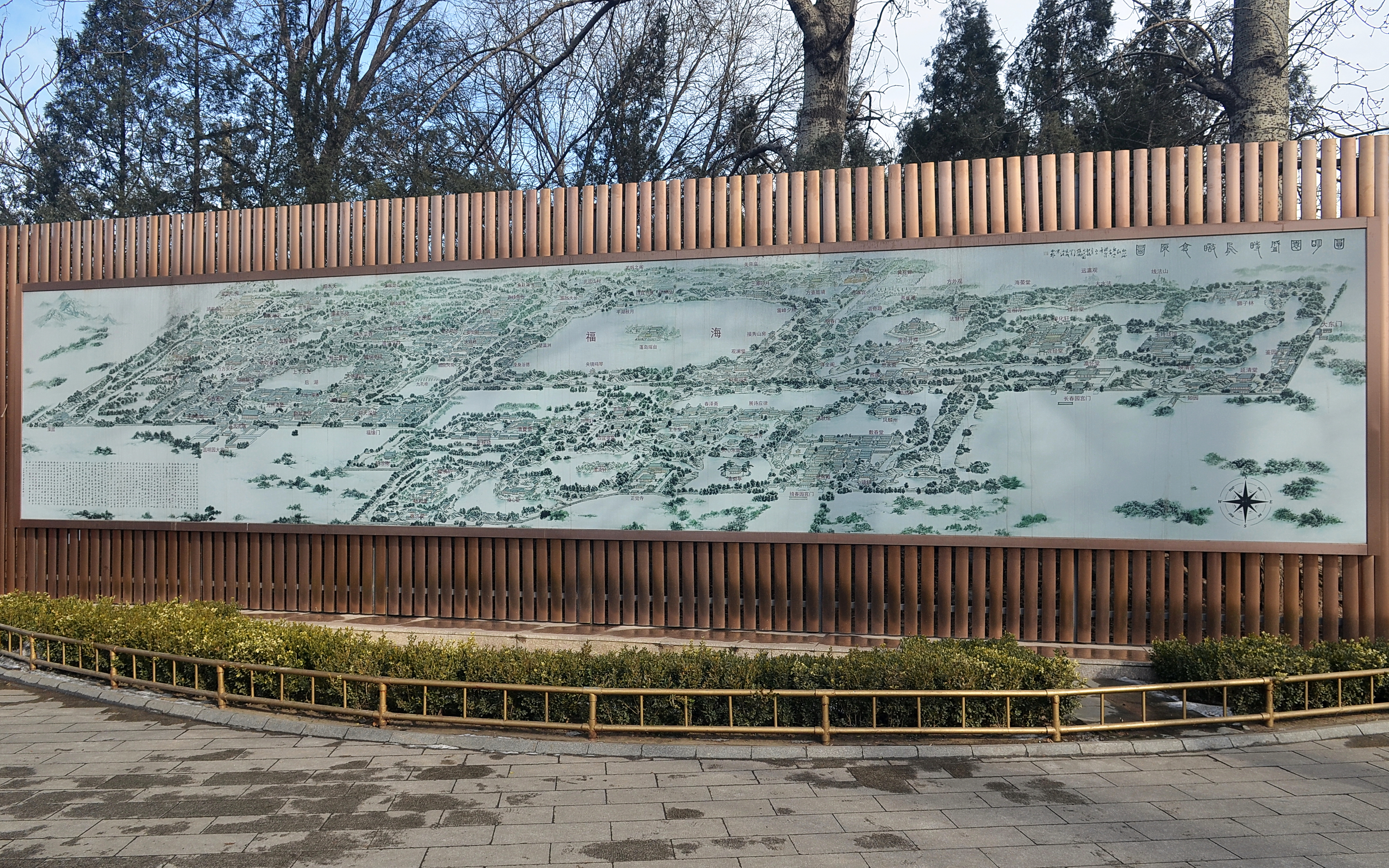
Plan of the Old Summer Palace

The Imperial Gardens at the Old Summer Palace were made up of three gardens:

1. Garden of Perfect Brightness (圆明园; 圓明園; Yuánmíng Yuán)
2. Garden of Eternal Spring (长春园; 長春園; Chángchūn Yuán)
3. Garden of Elegant Spring (绮春园; 綺春園; Qǐchūn Yuán)

Together, they covered an area of 3.5 square kilometres (860 acres; 1.4 sq mi), almost five times the size of the Forbidden City grounds and eight times the size of Vatican City. Hundreds of structures, such as halls, pavilions, temples, galleries, and bridges, stood on the grounds.

In addition, hundreds of examples of Chinese artwork and antiquities were stored in the halls, along with unique copies of literary works and compilations. Several famous landscapes of southern China had been reproduced in the Imperial Gardens.

=== Location ===
The palace was built on a site abundant in fresh water, near the Jade Spring Hill. The region was renowned for its beautiful landscape. Country homes were built here beginning in the 13th century, during the rule of the Yuan dynasty, then in the 16th-century Li Wei of the Ming Dynasty built the Qinghua Yuan estate at the site.

=== Western mansions ===
The most visible architectural remains of the Old Summer Palace can be found in the Western mansions (Xiyang Lou) section of 18th-century European-style palaces, fountains and formal gardens. These structures, built partly of stone but mainly with a Chinese infrastructure of timber columns, coloured tiles and brick walls, were planned and designed by the Jesuit Giuseppe Castiglione with Michel Benoist responsible for the fountains and waterwork. Qianlong Emperor became interested in the architectural project after seeing an engraving of a European fountain, and employed Castiglione and Benoist to carry out the work to satisfy his taste for exotic buildings and objects.

Western-style palaces, pavilion, aviaries, a maze, fountains, basins, and waterworks as well as perspective paintings organized as an outdoor theatre stage were constructed. A striking clock fountain was placed in front of the largest palace, the Haiyan Tang. The fountain had twelve animals of the Chinese zodiac that spouted water in turn every 2 hours, with all spouting water in concert at noon. These European-style buildings however only occupied an area along the back of the Garden of Eternal Spring that was small compared to the overall area of the gardens. More than 95% of the Imperial Gardens were made up of Chinese-style buildings. There were also a few buildings in Tibetan and Mongol styles, reflecting the diversity of the Qing Empire.

== History ==
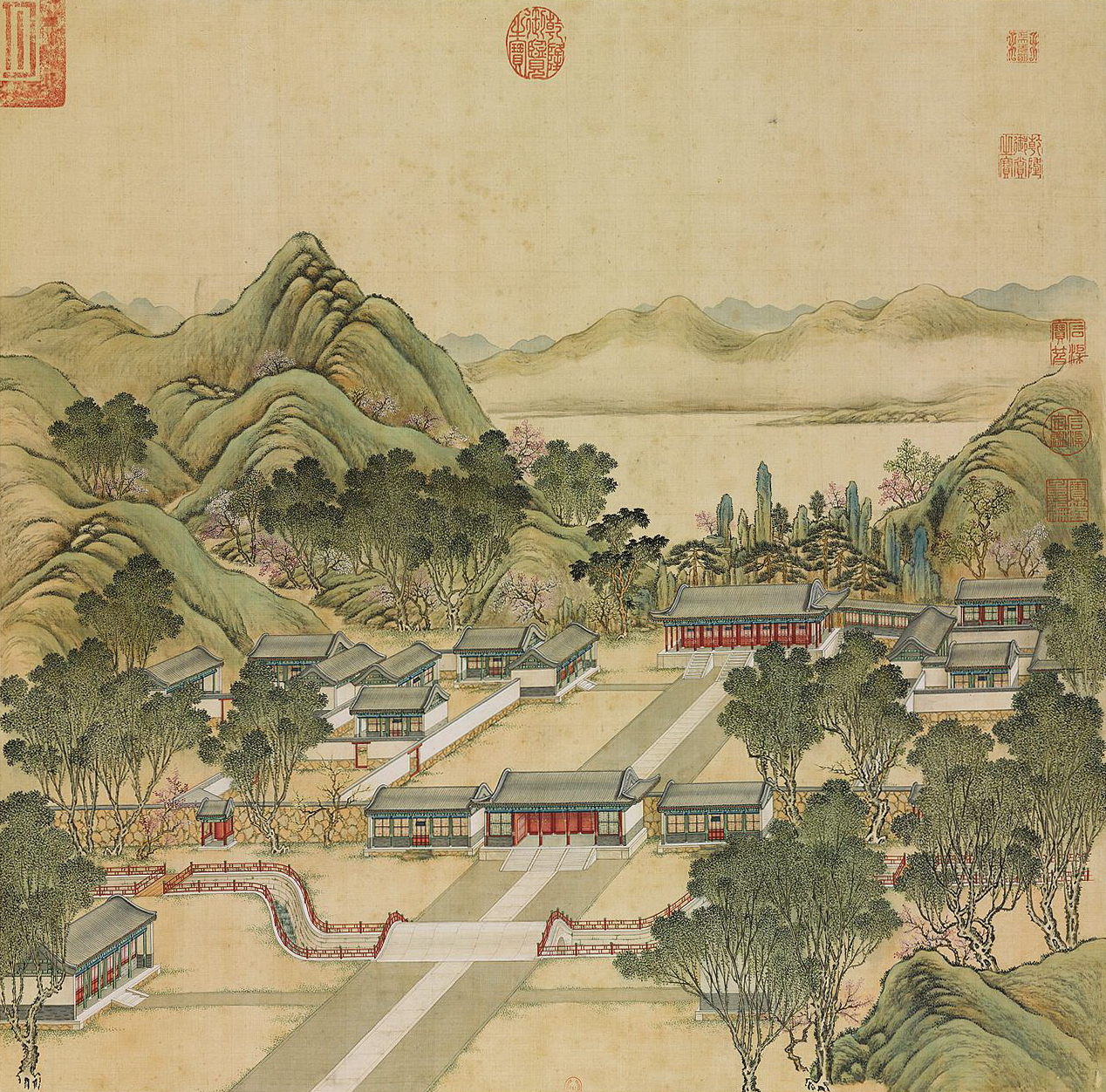
Forty Scenes of the Yuanmingyuan

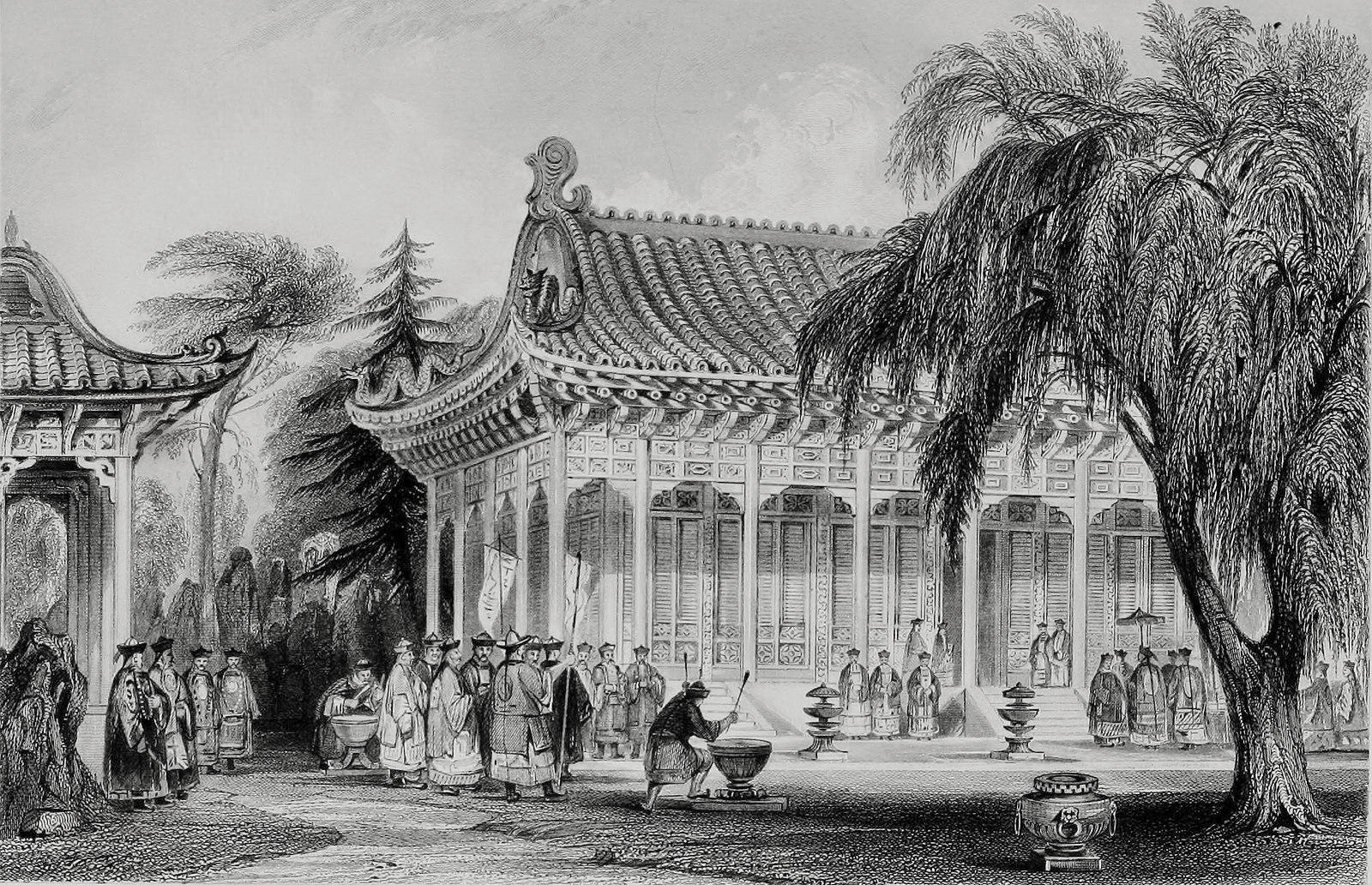
Old Summer Palace historic drawing

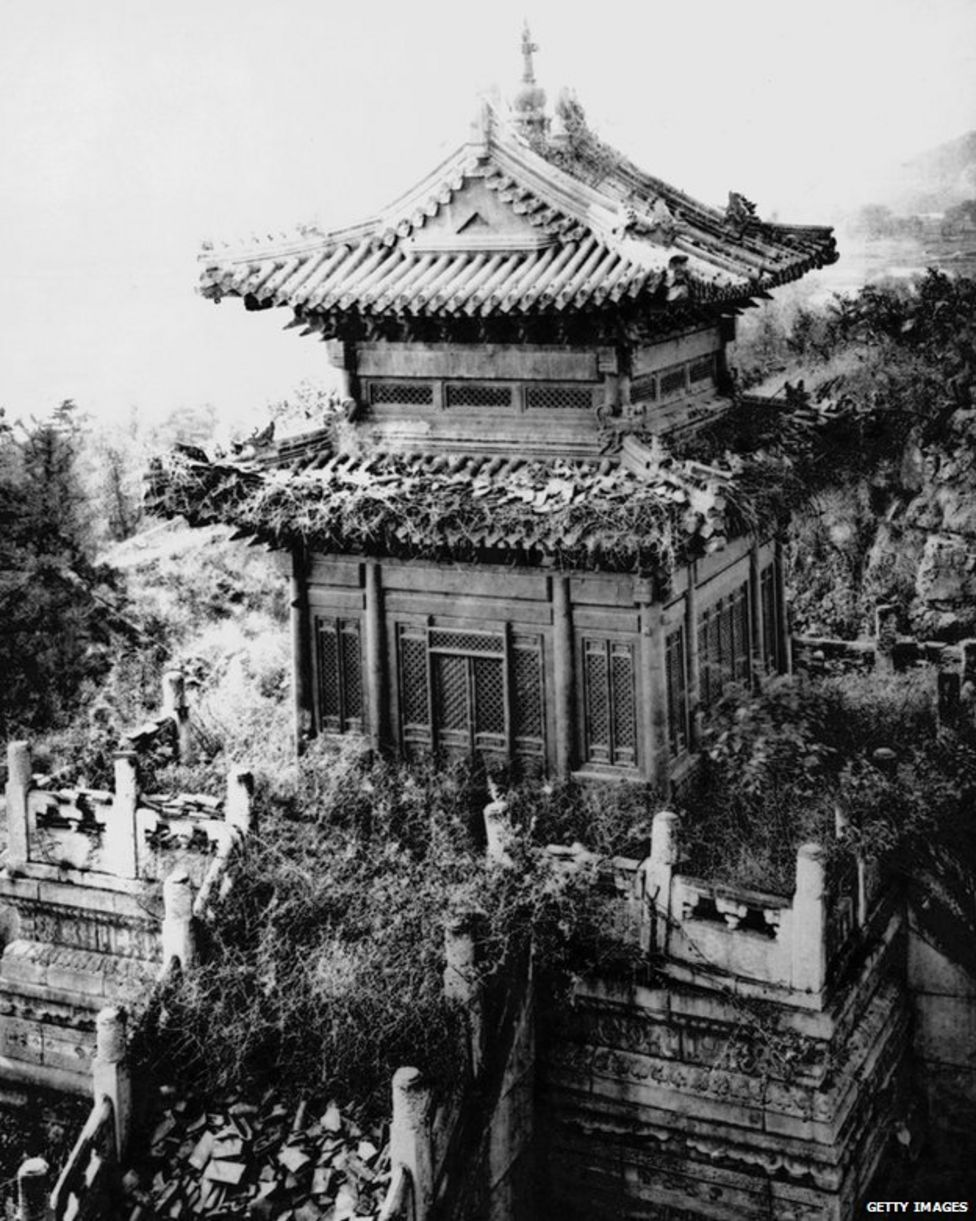
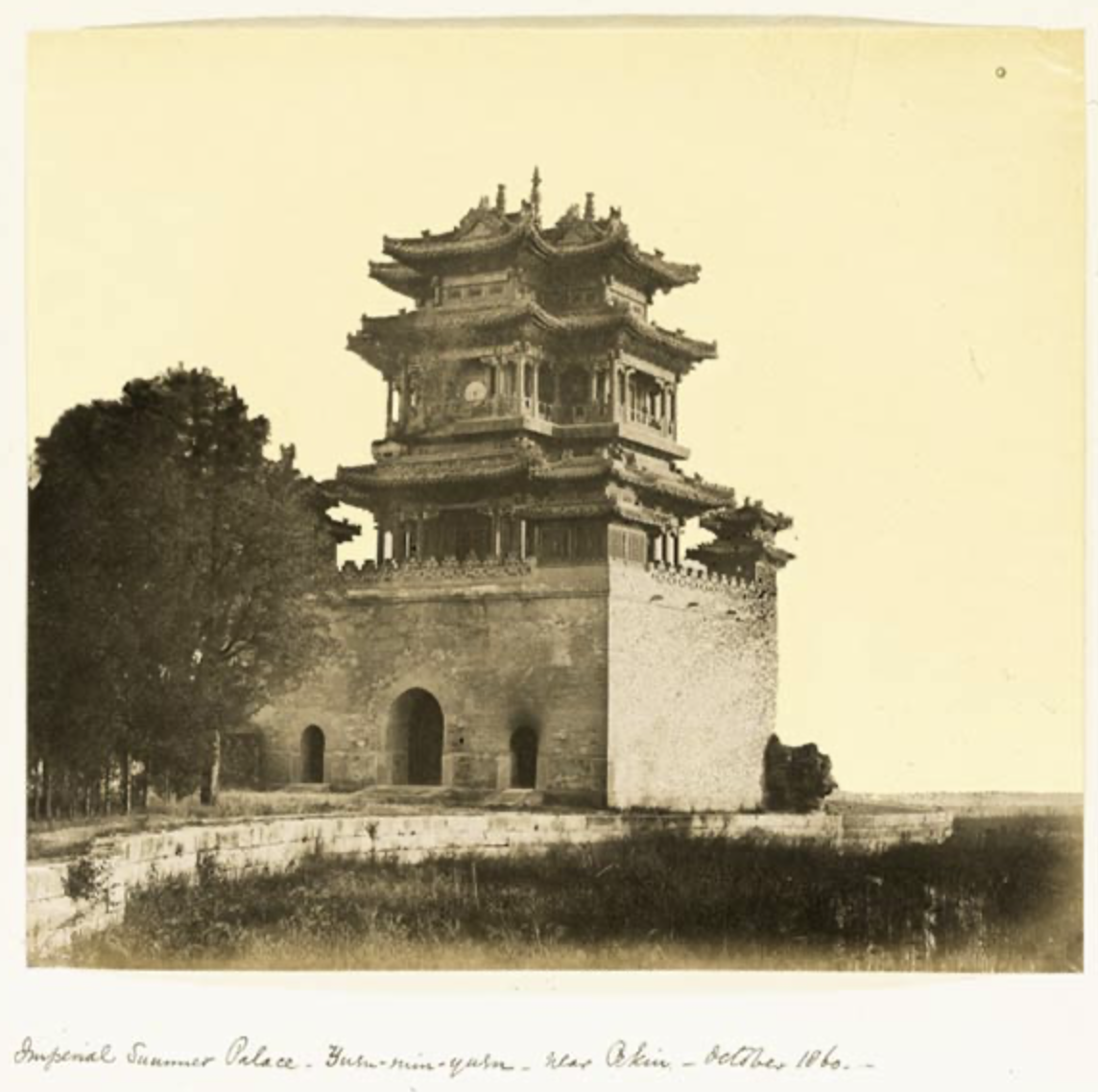
Old photos of a garden pavilion and tower taken in the 19th century, both were eventually destroyed.

Initial construction of the Old Summer Palace began in 1707 during the reign of the Kangxi Emperor. It was intended as a gift for the emperor's fourth son, Prince Yong (the future Yongzheng Emperor), who would greatly expand the Imperial Gardens in 1725. The Yongzheng Emperor also introduced the waterworks of the gardens, creating lakes, streams and ponds to complement the rolling hills and grounds, and named 28 scenic spots within the garden. The Yongzheng Emperor also constructed a number of "living tableaux" he and his family could observe and interact with. One such scene was called "Crops as Plentiful as Fields" which involved court eunuchs pretending to be rural farmers on an island. Another was called the "Courtyard of Universal Happiness" which was a mock village where the imperial family could interact with shopkeepers, again eunuchs in disguise.

During the Qianlong Emperor's reign, the second expansion was well underway and the number of scenic spots increased to 50 (the emperor personally directed the construction process). The splendors of the palace and the grounds were depicted in the Forty Scenes of the Yuanmingyuan, an album produced in 1744 by the Qianlong Emperor's court painters. The construction of the European-style palaces was initiated in 1747.

The last European appearance in the Old Summer Palace in the context of traditional Chinese imperial foreign relations was a diplomatic mission in 1795 representing the interests of the Dutch and Dutch East India Company. The Titsingh delegation included Isaac Titsingh, the Dutch-American Andreas Everardus van Braam Houckgeest, and the Frenchman Chrétien-Louis-Joseph de Guignes. Both published complementary accounts of the mission. Titsingh died before he could publish his version of the events.

== Destruction ==
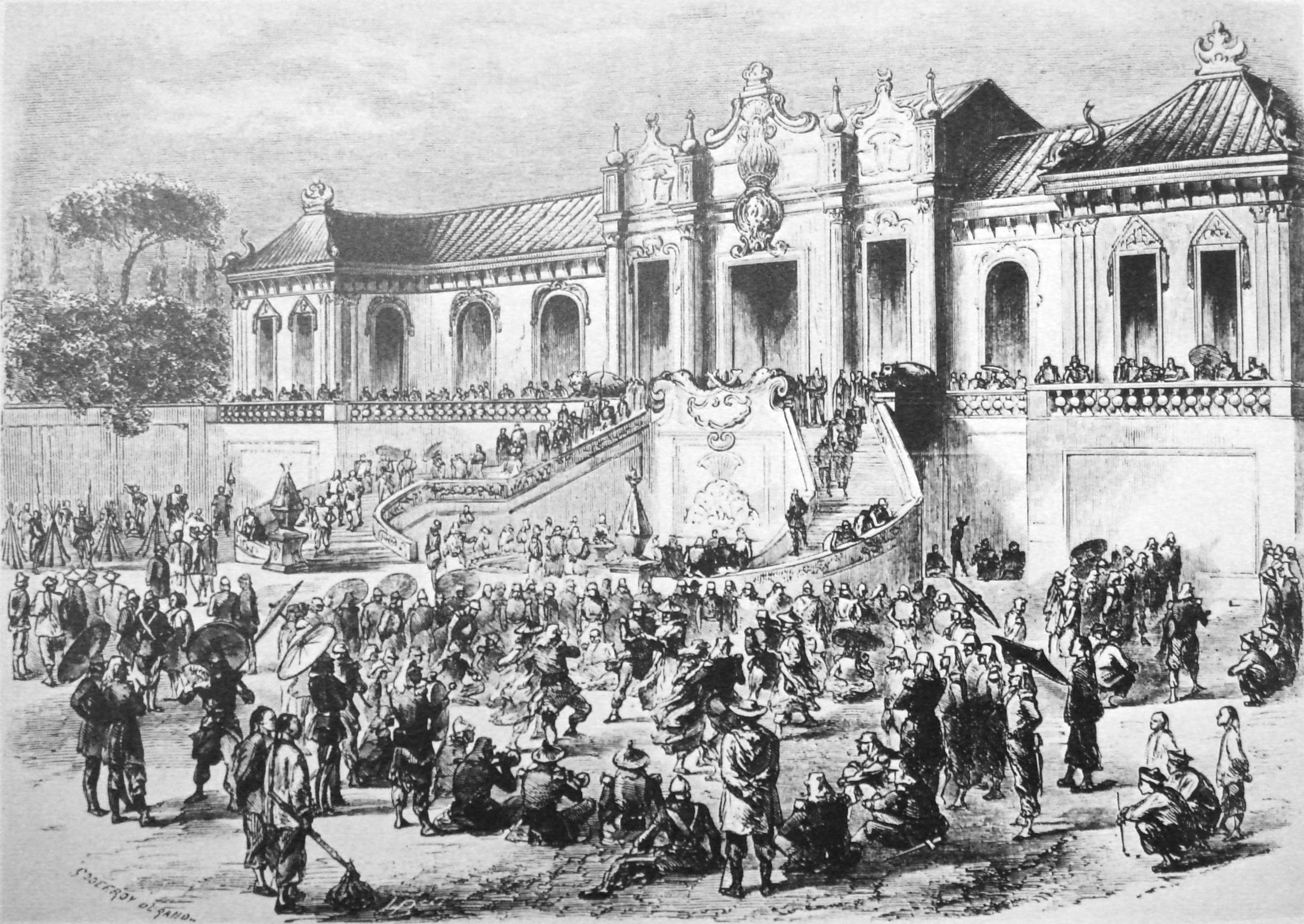
Looting of the Old Summer Palace by Anglo-French forces in 1860 during the Second Opium War.

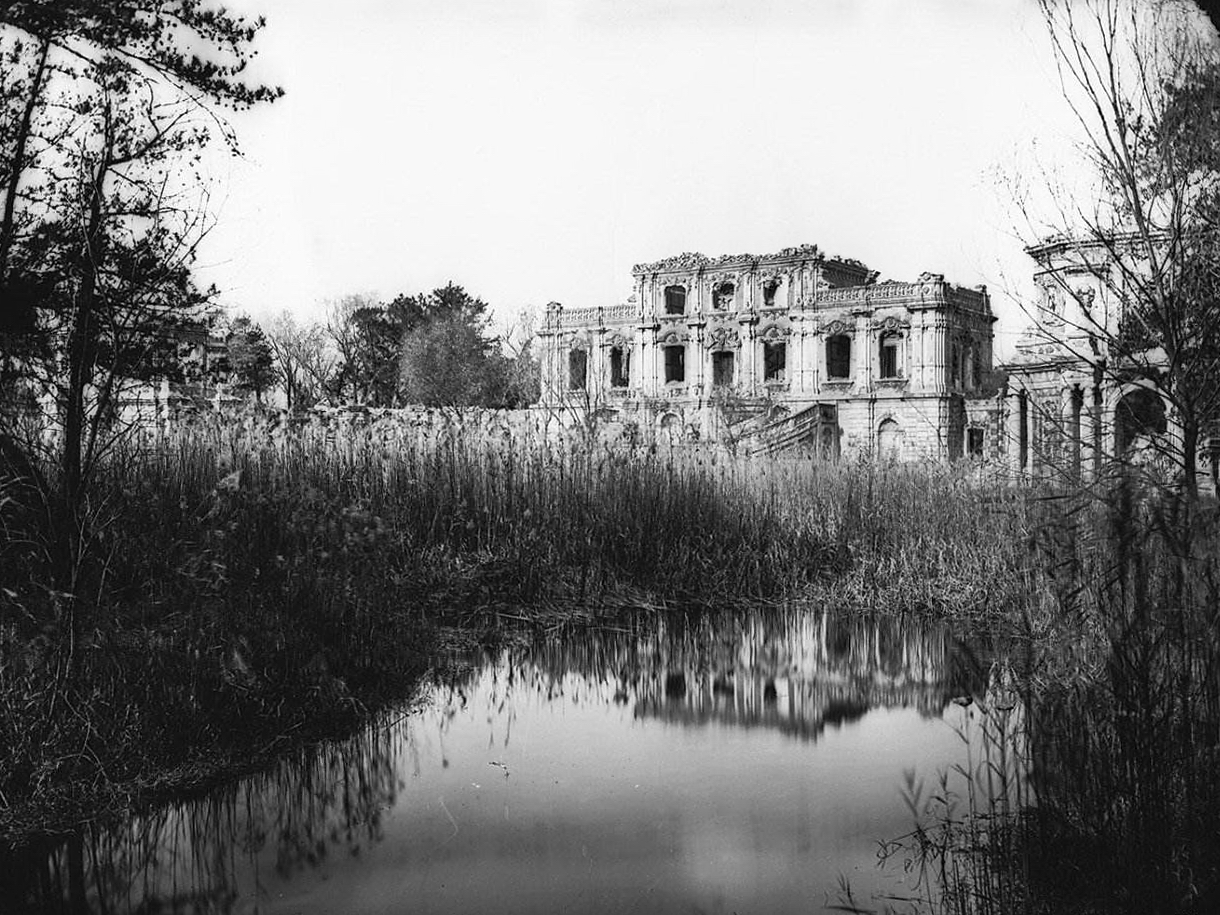
Ruins of the Old Summer Palace 1870s

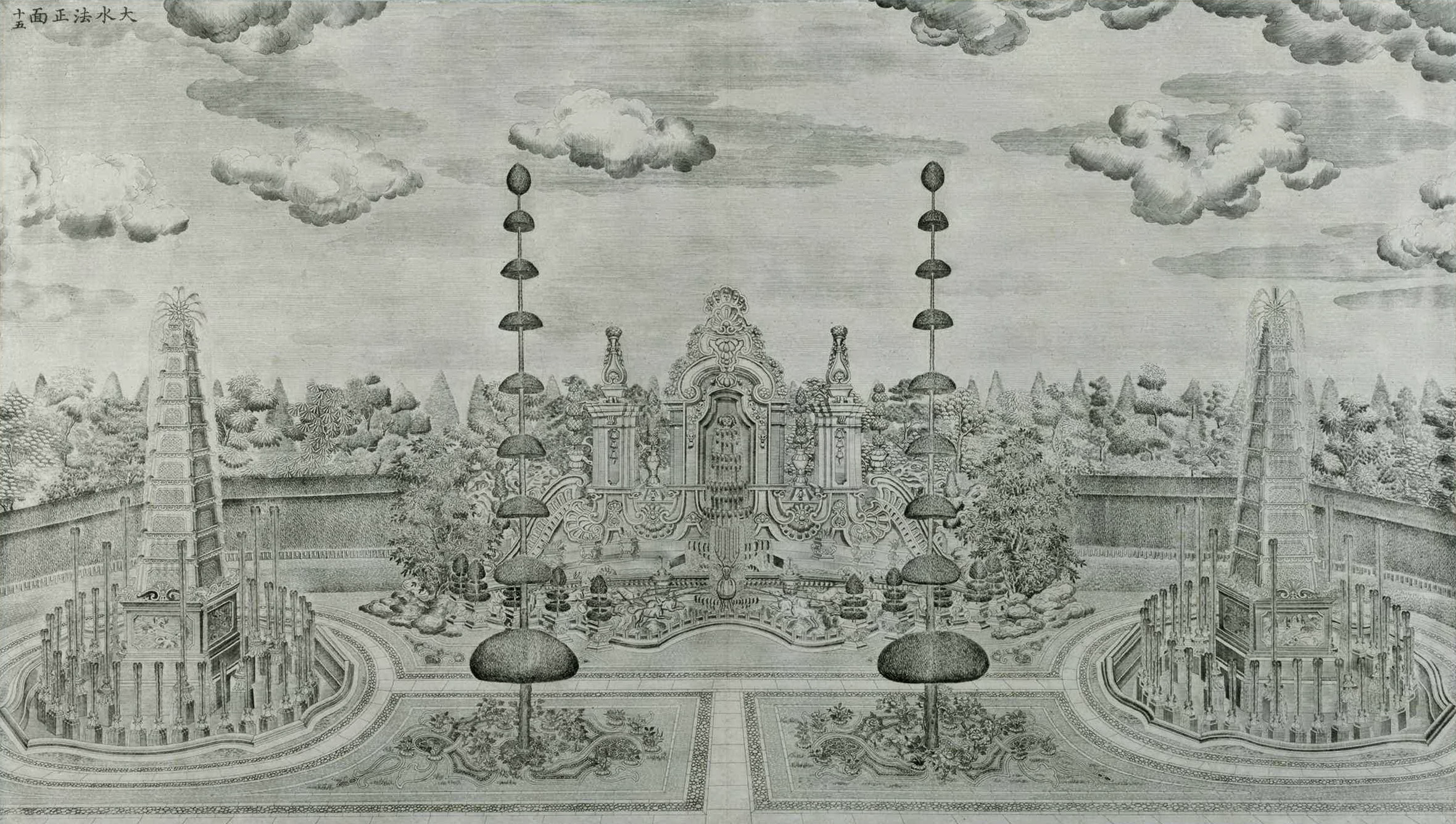
Drawing of formal European gardens in the Xiyang Lou (西洋樓, Western mansions) section

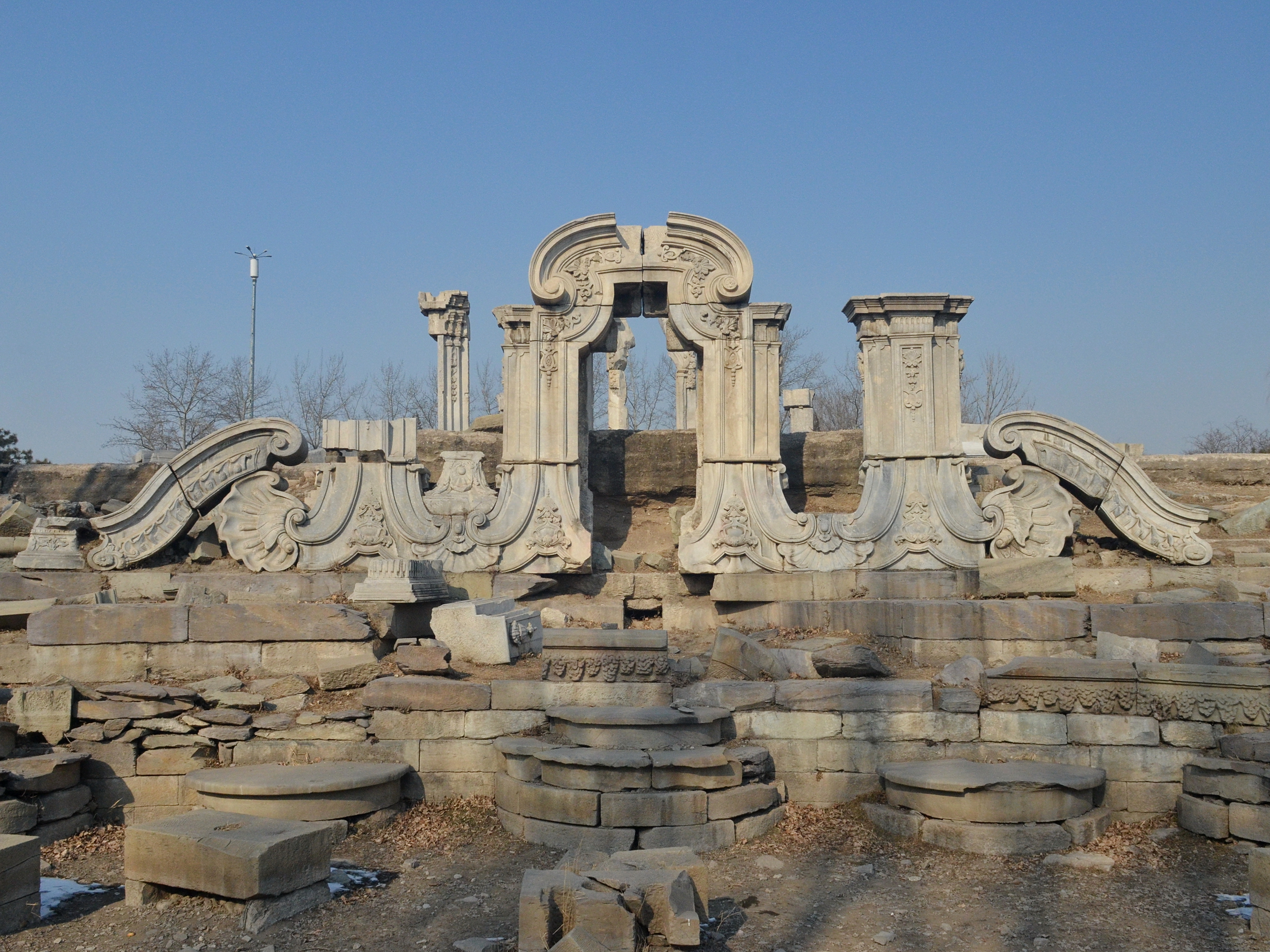
Ruins of the European-style palaces

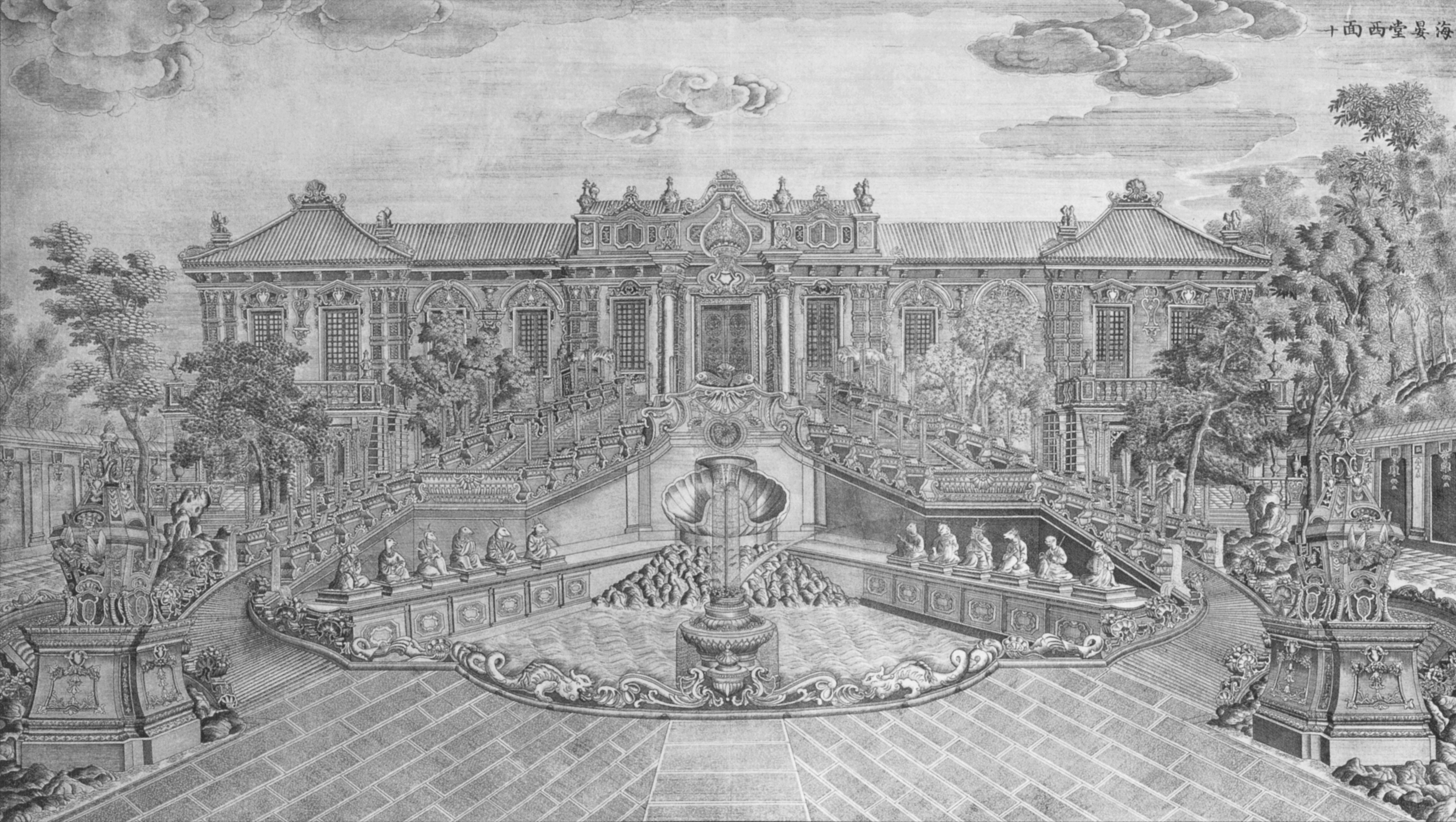
The original figures in a drawing before the looting with all 12 head figures of the Old Summer Palace fountain

In 1860, during the Second Opium War, a combined Anglo-French expeditionary force, having marched inland from the coast at Tianjin (Tientsin), arrived in Beijing (Peking).

In mid-September, two envoys, Henry Loch and Harry Parkes, went ahead of the main force under a flag of truce to negotiate with Prince Yi and representatives of the Qing Empire at Tongzhou (Tungchow) and to scout out campsites behind enemy lines. The delegation included Thomas William Bowlby, a journalist for The Times, along with a small escort of British and Indian soldiers. As the talks concluded on 18 September, the Allied forces attacked Qing troops in the area who they believed were redeploying for an ambush, and the Qing court learned that the British had detained the prefect of Tianjin. It was around this time that the Qing general Sengge Rinchen took the members of the delegation prisoner as they were traversing Qing lines to return to the expeditionary forces. The delegates and their escort were taken to the Ministry of Justice (or Board of Punishments) in Beijing, where they were confined and tortured. Parkes and Loch were returned after two weeks, with 14 other survivors. Nineteen British, French and Indian captives died as a result of the torture.

On the night of 5 October, French units diverted from the main attack force towards the Old Summer Palace. At the time, the palace was occupied by only some eunuchs and palace maids; the Xianfeng Emperor and his entourage had already fled to the Chengde Mountain Resort in Hebei. Although the French commander Charles Cousin-Montauban assured his British counterpart, James Hope Grant, that "nothing had been touched", extensive looting of the palace had already been carried out by Allied soldiers. There was no significant resistance to the looting, even though many Qing soldiers were in the vicinity.

On October 18, Lord Elgin, the British High Commissioner to China, retaliated against the torture of the delegation members by ordering the destruction of the Old Summer Palace, which Cousin-Montauban refused to participate in. Destroying the Old Summer Palace was also a warning to the Qing Empire not to use kidnapping as a political tactic against Britain. It took 3,500 British troops to set the entire place ablaze, and the massive fire lasted for three days. No French soldier participated. Unbeknownst to the troops, some 300 remaining eunuchs and palace maids, who concealed themselves from the soldiers in locked rooms, perished when the palace complex was burnt. Only 13 buildings survived intact, most of them in the remote areas or by the lakeside. (The palace would be sacked once again and completely destroyed in 1900 when the forces of the Eight-Nation Alliance invaded Beijing.) Charles George Gordon, who was then a 27-year-old captain in the Royal Engineers and part of the 1860 Anglo-French expeditionary force, wrote about his experience:

We went out, and, after pillaging it, burned the whole place, destroying in a vandal-like manner most valuable property which [could] not be replaced for four millions. We got upward of £48 apiece prize money ... I have done well. The [local] people are very civil, but I think the grandees hate us, as they must after what we did the Palace. You can scarcely imagine the beauty and magnificence of the places we burnt. It made one's heart sore to burn them; in fact, these places were so large, and we were so pressed for time, that we could not plunder them carefully. Quantities of gold ornaments were burnt, considered as brass. It was wretchedly demoralising work for an army.

British and French soldiers preferred porcelain while neglecting bronze vessels prized locally for cooking and burial in tombs. Many such treasures dated back to the Shang, Zhou and Han dynasties and were up to 3,600 years old. A specific exception was the looting of the Haiyantang Zodiac fountain with its twelve bronze animal heads. Some of the most notable treasures ended up at the Chinese Museum in the Palace of Fontainebleau, which Empress Eugénie specifically set up in 1867 to house these newly acquired collections.

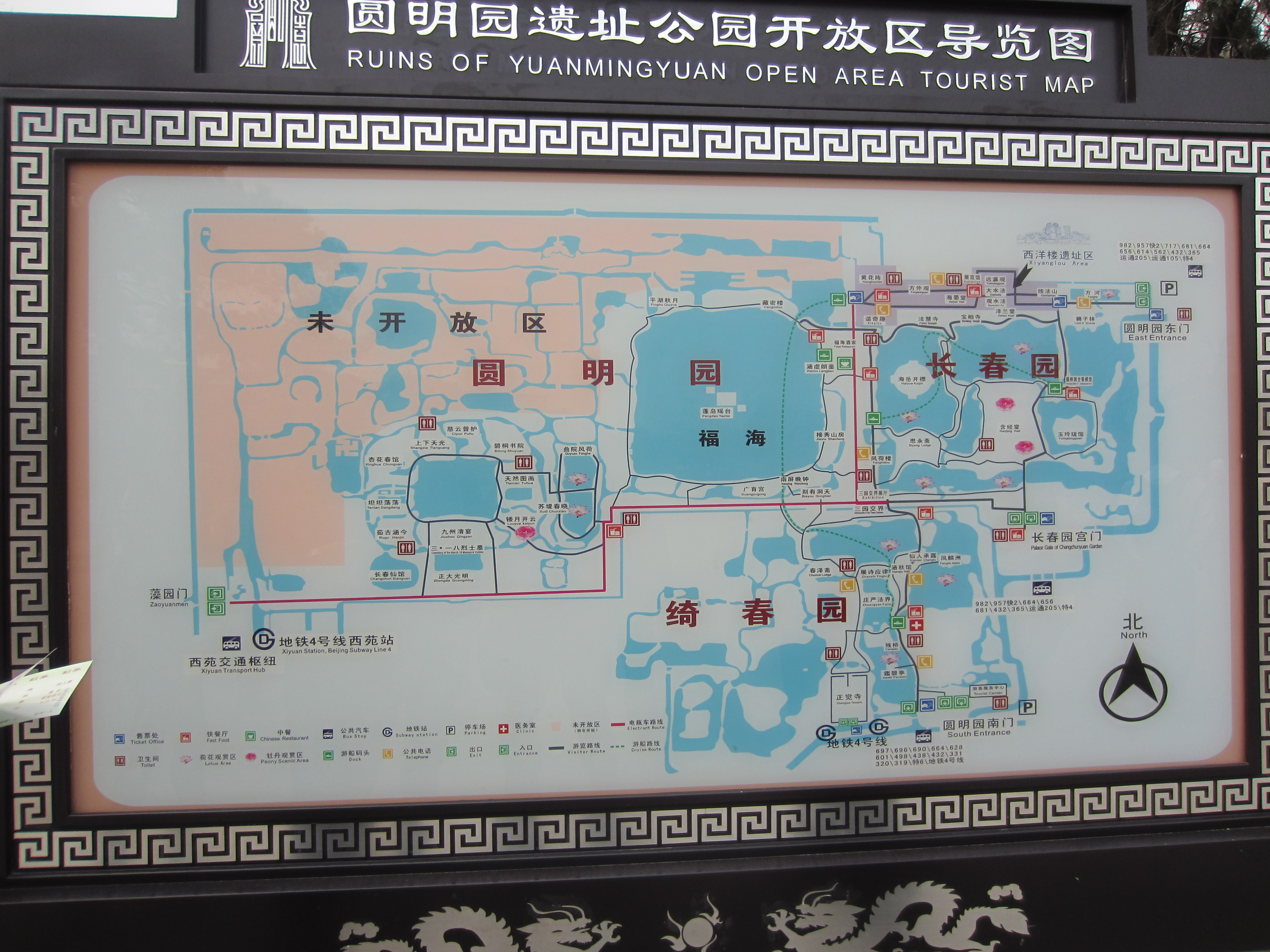
Ruins of Yuanmingyuan open area tourist map

Once the Old Summer Palace had been reduced a sign was raised by the Allied expeditionary force with an inscription in Chinese stating, "This is the reward for perfidy and cruelty". The burning of the palace was the last act of the war.

According to Professor Wang Daocheng of the Renmin University of China, not all of the palace was destroyed in the original burning. Instead, some historical records indicate that 16 of the garden scenes survived the destruction in 1860. Wang identifies the Republican era and the Cultural Revolution as two significant periods that contributed further to the destruction of the Old Summer Palace. Photographic evidence and eyewitness accounts make it clear that (although the palace complex was initially protected by the Qing emperors) it was during the Boxer Rebellion and in the immediate aftermath of the fall of the dynasty when most of the surviving structures were destroyed. Further, the Imperial household itself sold off the magnificent trees in the garden for revenue during the 1890s and after 1900 the palace was used as a veritable builder's yard for anyone who wanted construction materials. Entire buildings were built of materials taken from the Yuanming Yuan and smart Peking houses were adorned with sculptures and architectural elements plundered from the site.

Like the Forbidden City, no commoner had ever been allowed into the Old Summer Palace, as it was used exclusively by the imperial family of the Qing Empire. The burning of the Old Summer Palace is still a very sensitive issue in China today. The destruction of the palace has been perceived as barbaric and criminal by many Chinese, as well as by external observers. In his letter "Expédition de Chine", Victor Hugo described the looting as, "Two robbers breaking into a museum. One has looted, the other has burnt. ... one of the two conquerors filled its pockets, seeing that, the other filled its safes; and they came back to Europe laughing hand-in-hand. ... Before history, one of the bandits will be called France and the other England." In his letter, Hugo hoped that one day France would feel guilty and return what it had plundered from China. For his apologetic literature, a bust of the French writer was erected in the Old Summer Palace in 2010.

== Aftermath ==
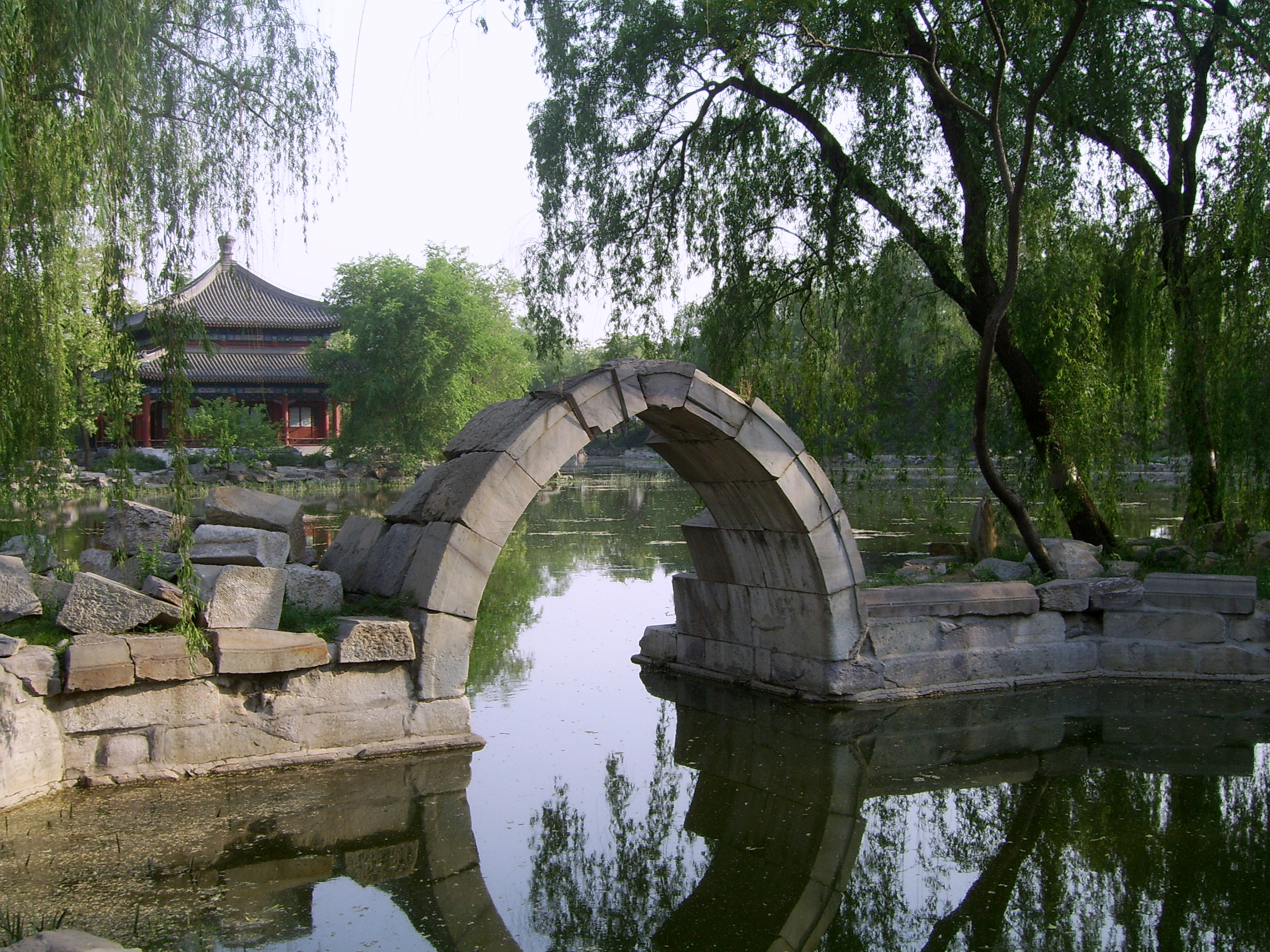
The pavilion and the stone arch are among the few remaining buildings in the Old Summer Palace

Following the sacking of the Old Summer Palace, the Qing imperial court relocated to the Forbidden City.

In 1873, the teenage Tongzhi Emperor attempted to rebuild the Old Summer Palace, on the pretext of turning it into a place of retirement for his two former regents, the empress dowagers Ci'an and Cixi. However, the imperial court lacked the financial resources to rebuild the palace, and at the urging of the court, the emperor finally agreed to stop the project in 1874. During the 1880s, an adjacent imperial gardens, the Gardens of Clear Ripples (the present-day Summer Palace) was restored for the use of Empress Dowager Cixi as a new summer resort, albeit on a smaller scale.

A few Chinese-style buildings in the outlying Elegant Spring Garden also survived the fire. Some of these buildings were restored by the Tongzhi Emperor before the project was abandoned. In 1900, many of the buildings that had survived or had been restored were burnt by the forces of the Eight-Nation Alliance.

Most of the site was left abandoned and used by local farmers as agricultural land. Only in the 1980s was the site reclaimed by the government and turned into a historical site. The Yuanmingyuan Artists Colony became famous for germinating a new wave of painters such as Fang Lijun and musicians such as Fa Zi on the site before it was shut down by the government and many artists relocated to the Songzhuang area outside of Beijing, where they started the Songzhuang art colony. Debates in the 1990s arose regarding restoration and development issues and a more recent environmental controversy brought a new political life to the park as it became a symbol of China's "national wound".

In the present day, the ruins of the European-style palaces are the most prominent building remnants on the site. This has misled some visitors to believe wrongly that the Old Summer Palace was made up only of European-style buildings.

== Recent developments and plans ==
There are currently several plans in China for rebuilding the Imperial Gardens, but such moves have been opposed on the grounds that they will destroy an important relic of modern Chinese history. In addition, any rebuilding would be a colossal undertaking, and no rebuilding of above-the-ground structures has been approved. However, the lakes and waterways in the eastern half of the gardens have been dug up again and refilled with water, while hills around the lakes have been cleared of brushwood, recreating long-forgotten vistas. Several temples located inside the Old Summer Palace grounds have also been refurbished and rebuilt.

In February 2005, work was undertaken to reduce water loss from the lakes and canals in the Old Summer Palace by covering a total of 1.33 square kilometres (0.51 sq mi) of the beds with a membrane to reduce seepage. The park administration argued the prevention of water loss saves the park money, since water would have to be added to the lakes only once per year instead of three times. However, opponents of the project, such as Professor Zhengchun Zhang of Lanzhou University, feared the measure will destroy the ecology of the park, which depends on the water seepage from the lakes and the connection between the lakes and the underground water system. It is also feared the reduced seepage from the lakes will disturb Beijing's underground water system which is already suffering from depletion. There are also concerns about the gardens, which is a designated heritage site in the city of Beijing, changing their natural appearance. This issue, when brought up with the general public several weeks later, immediately caused an uproar from the press and became one of the hottest debates on the Internet in China due to the still painful memory of foreign humiliation epitomised in the destruction of the Old Summer Palace. The Beijing Environmental Protection Bureau (BEPB) recently conducted an assessment of the environmental impact of the measure.

A partial copy of the palace, the "New Yuanming Gardens" (圆明新园; 圓明新園), was built in 1997 in the southern city of Zhuhai in Guangdong province, as an amusement park of 1.39 square kilometres (0.54 sq mi), including an 80,000-square-metre (860,000 sq ft) lake.

Up to the present, many relics which were taken from the Old Summer Palace remain in foreign museums and private collections. Although the Chinese government has tried to recover them, only a few statuettes from the Garden of Eternal Spring have actually been returned. Seven of the 21 columns displayed at the KODE Art Museums in Bergen, Norway were returned to Peking University in 2014 as part of a deal set up by alumnus Huang Nubo, a real estate developer who donated NOK 10,000,000 (US$1.6 million) to the museum, according to the China Daily.

It is still debated in China whether to apply for an inclusion of the Old Summer Palace on the list of UNESCO World Heritage Sites.

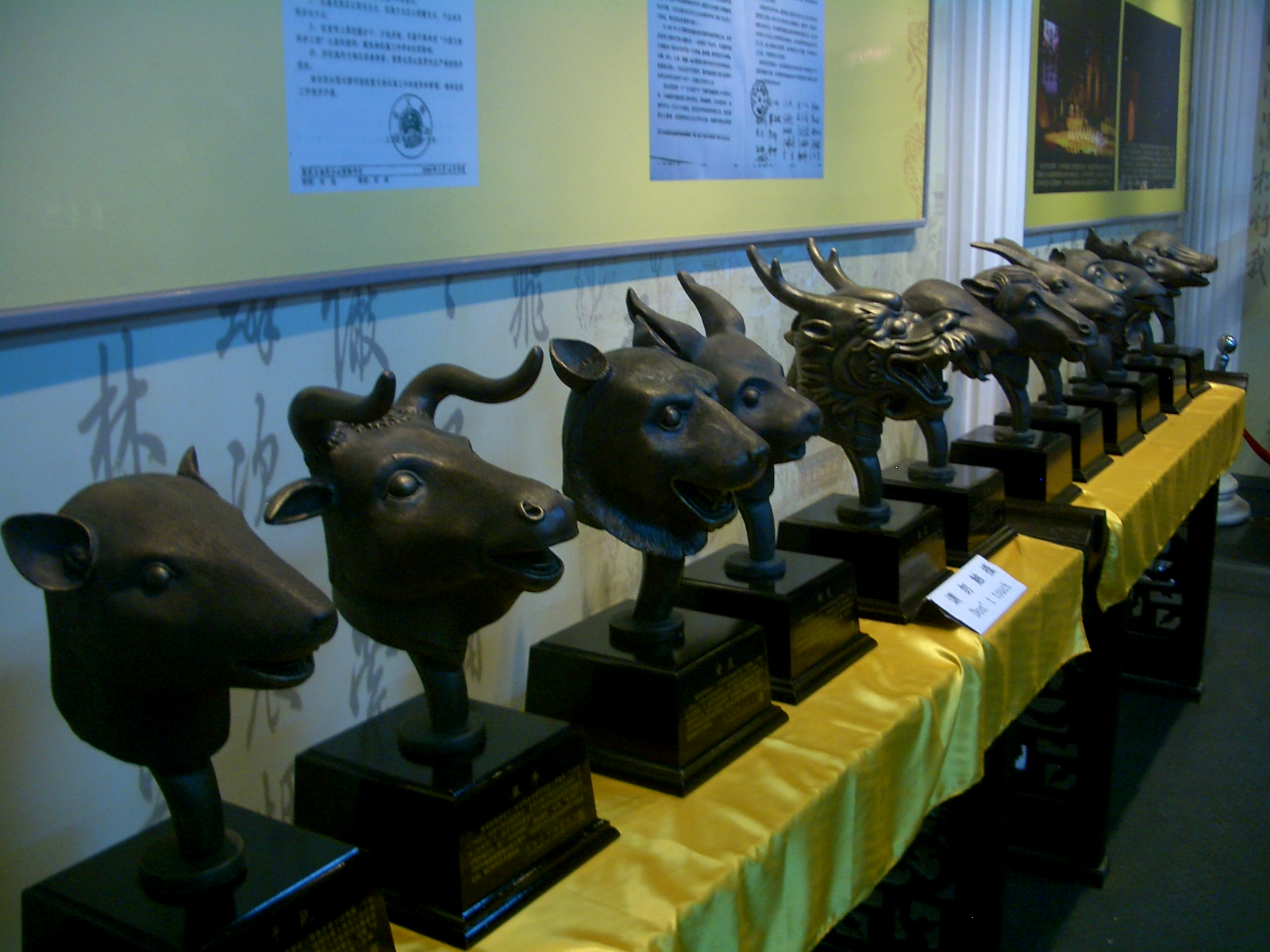
Replicas of the 12 heads

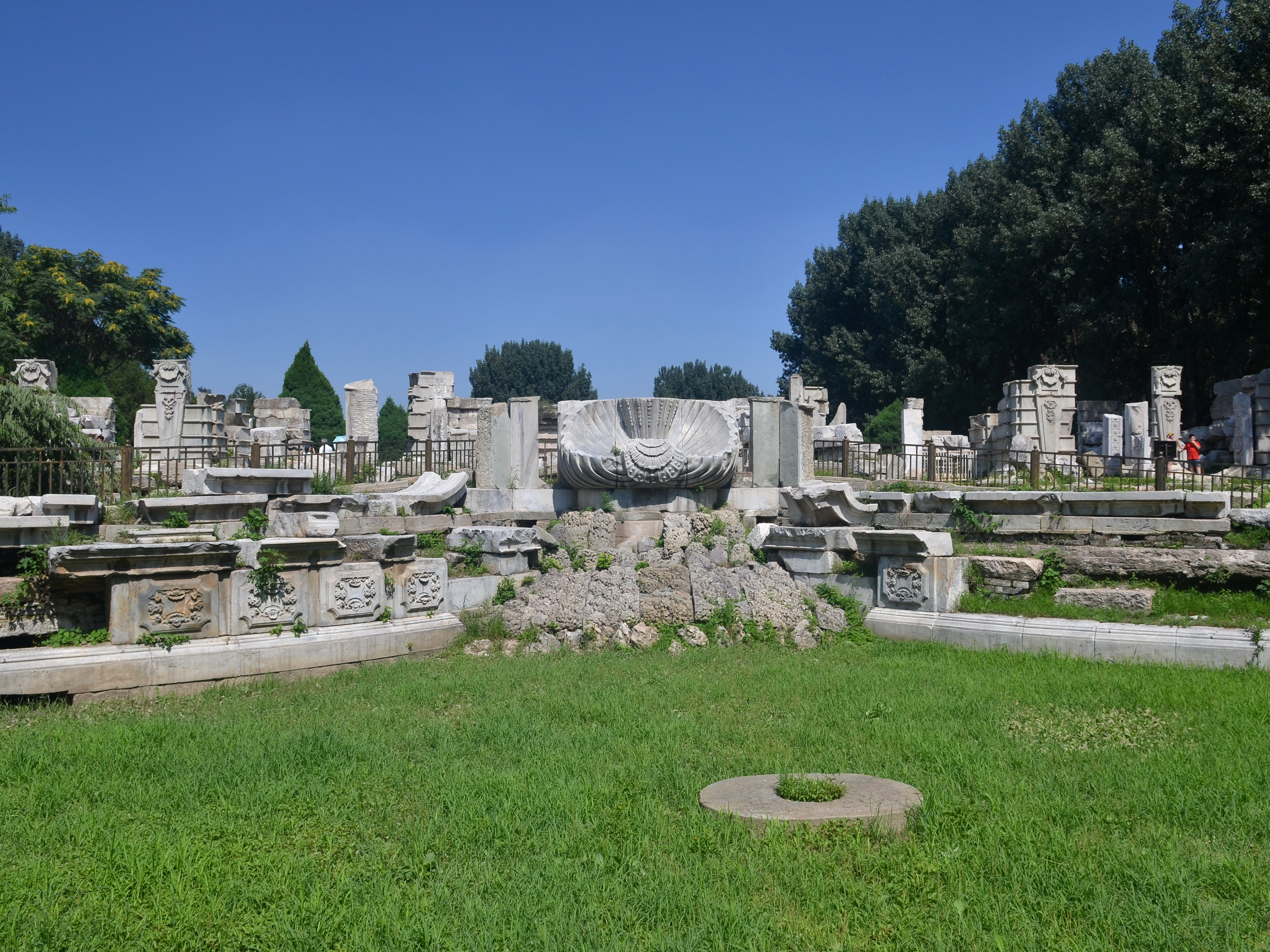
The Haiyantang site in 2012

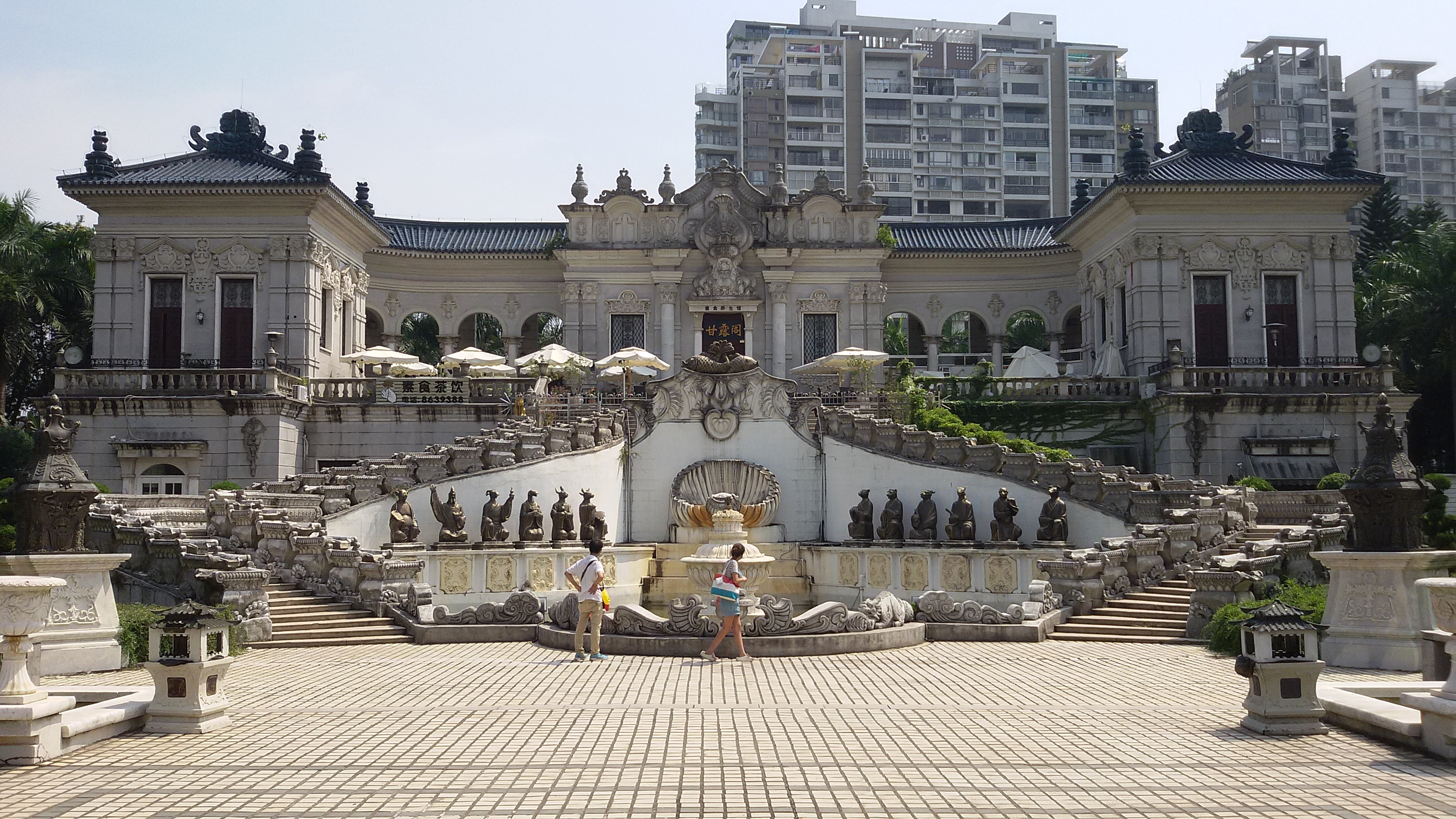
Reconstructed replica of Haiyantang in the New Yuanming Palace in Zhuhai

== Transport ==
The ruins of the Old Summer Palace remain open to the public and are an important tourist attraction in Haidian District, the Yuanmingyuan Park. They can be accessed from Yuanmingyuan Park station on Line 4 of the Beijing Subway.

== Gallery ==
Hundreds more photographs of the site can be found on the website Colonial Architecture Project

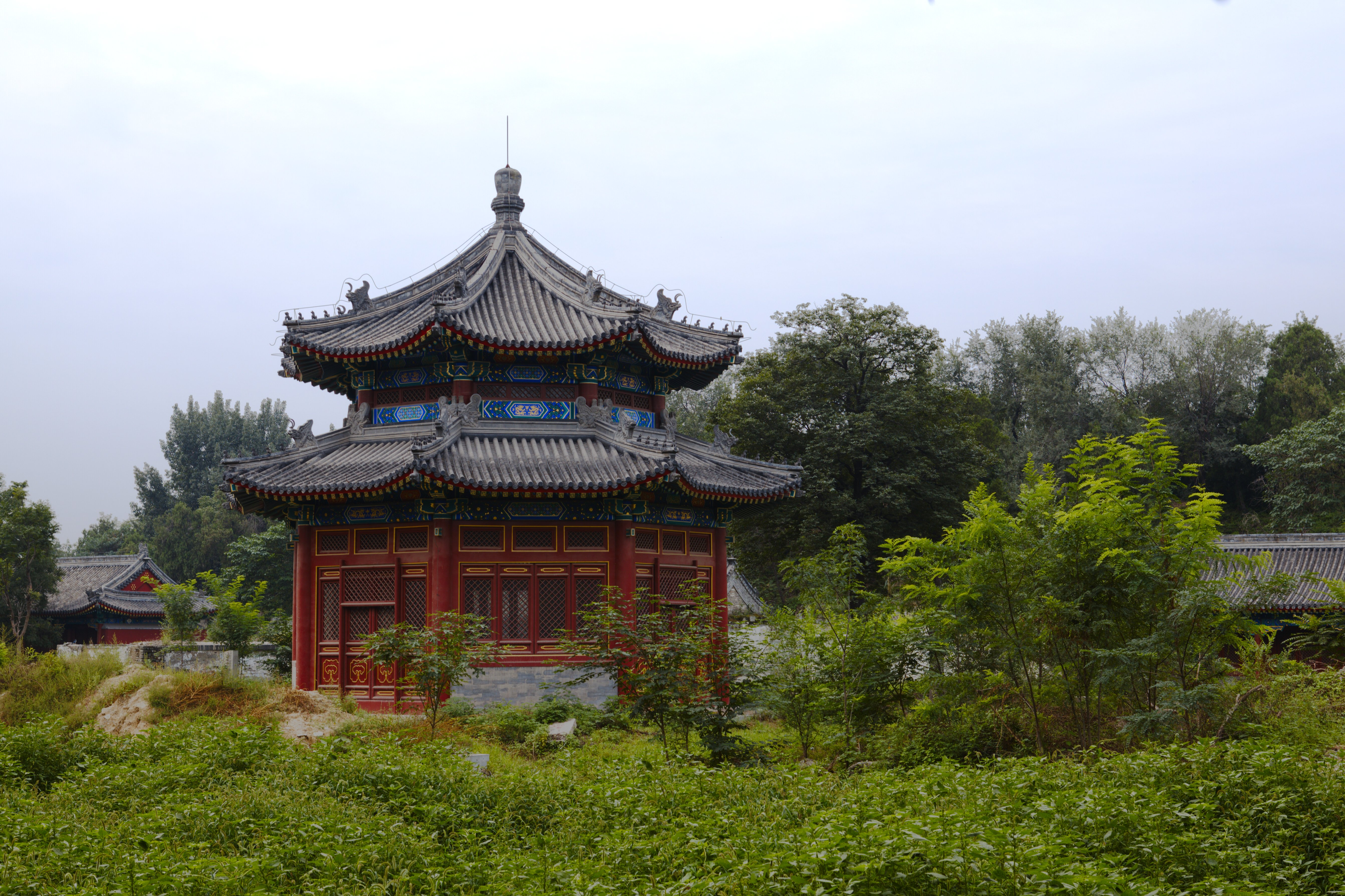
Parts of the Zhengjue Temple (正觉寺) of Elegant Spring Garden are being refurbished

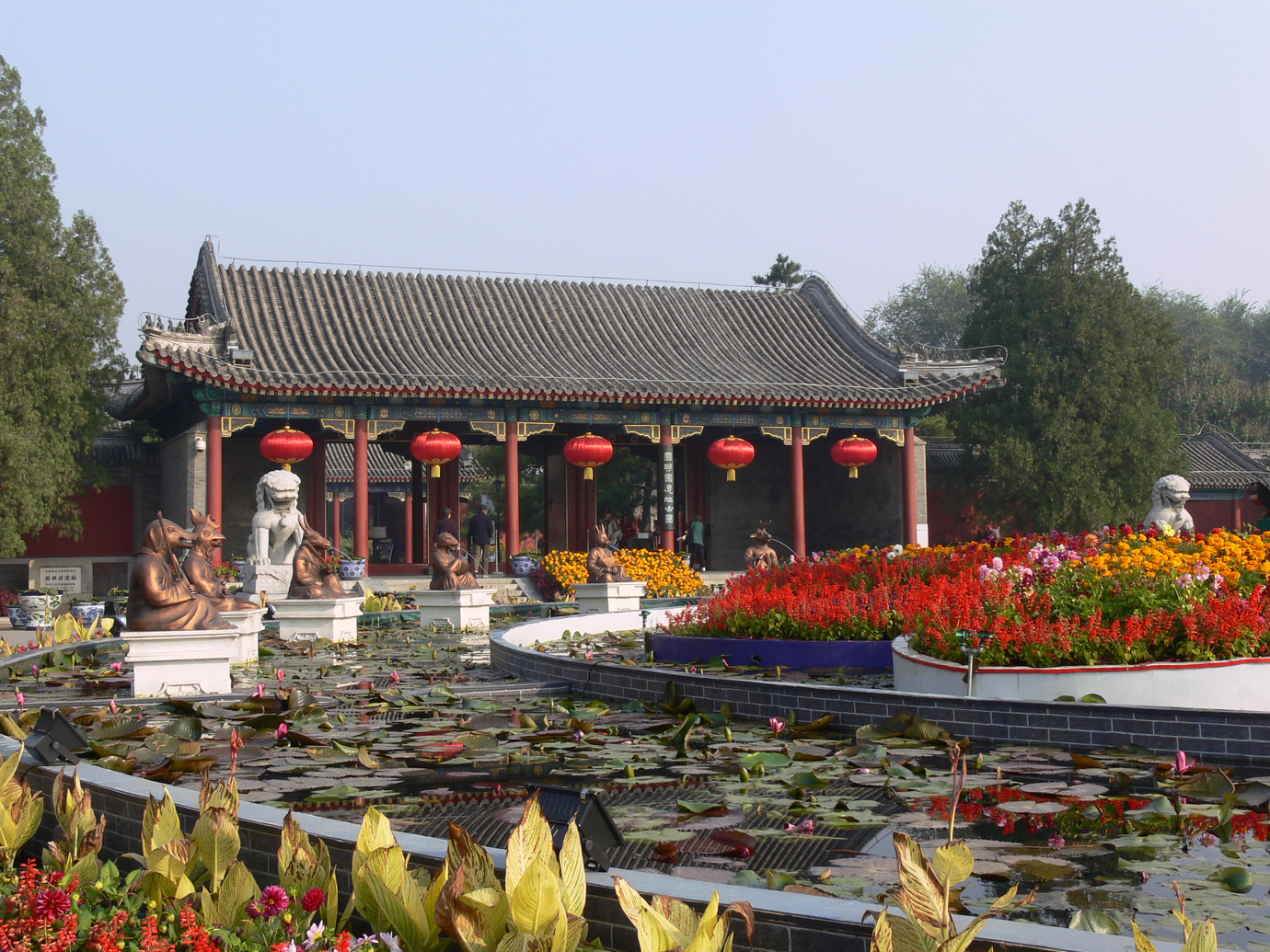
Entrance to the Yuanmingyuan Park (site of the original gate to the Elegant Spring Garden)

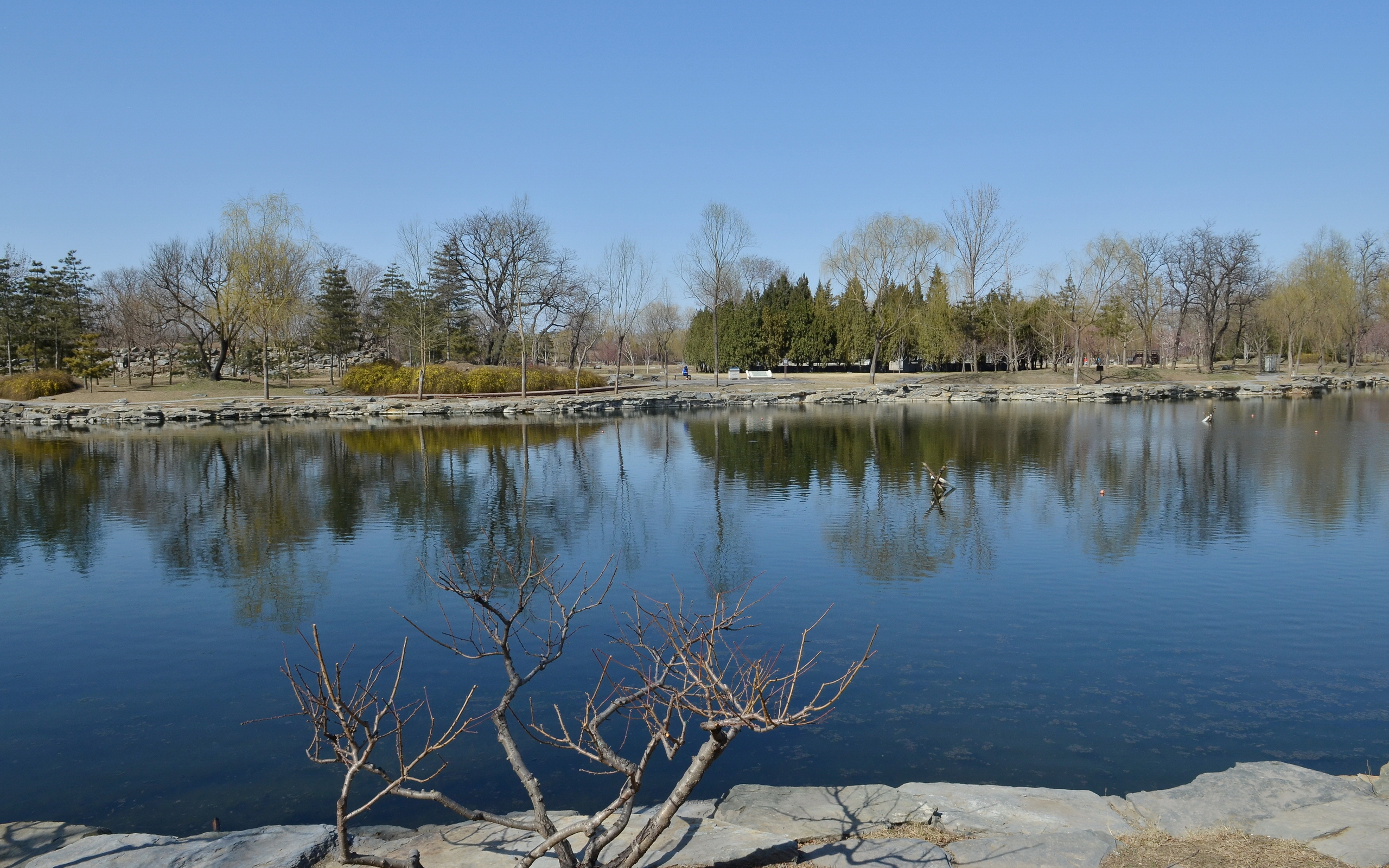
Front Lake of Jiuzhou (九州前湖), on the other side of the lake lies the site of Jiuzhou Qingyan (九洲清晏)

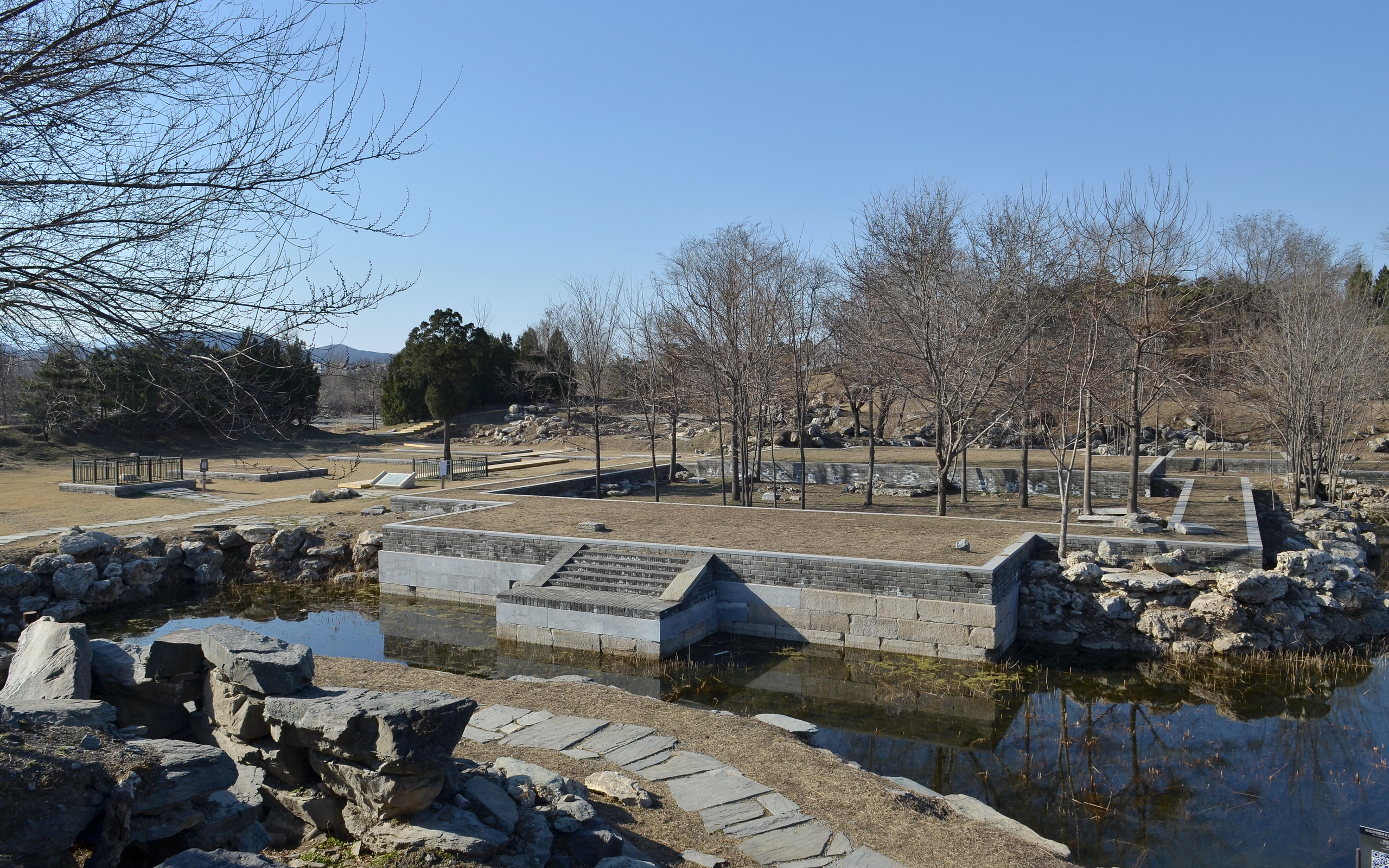
Apricot Blossom Spring Villa (杏花春馆)

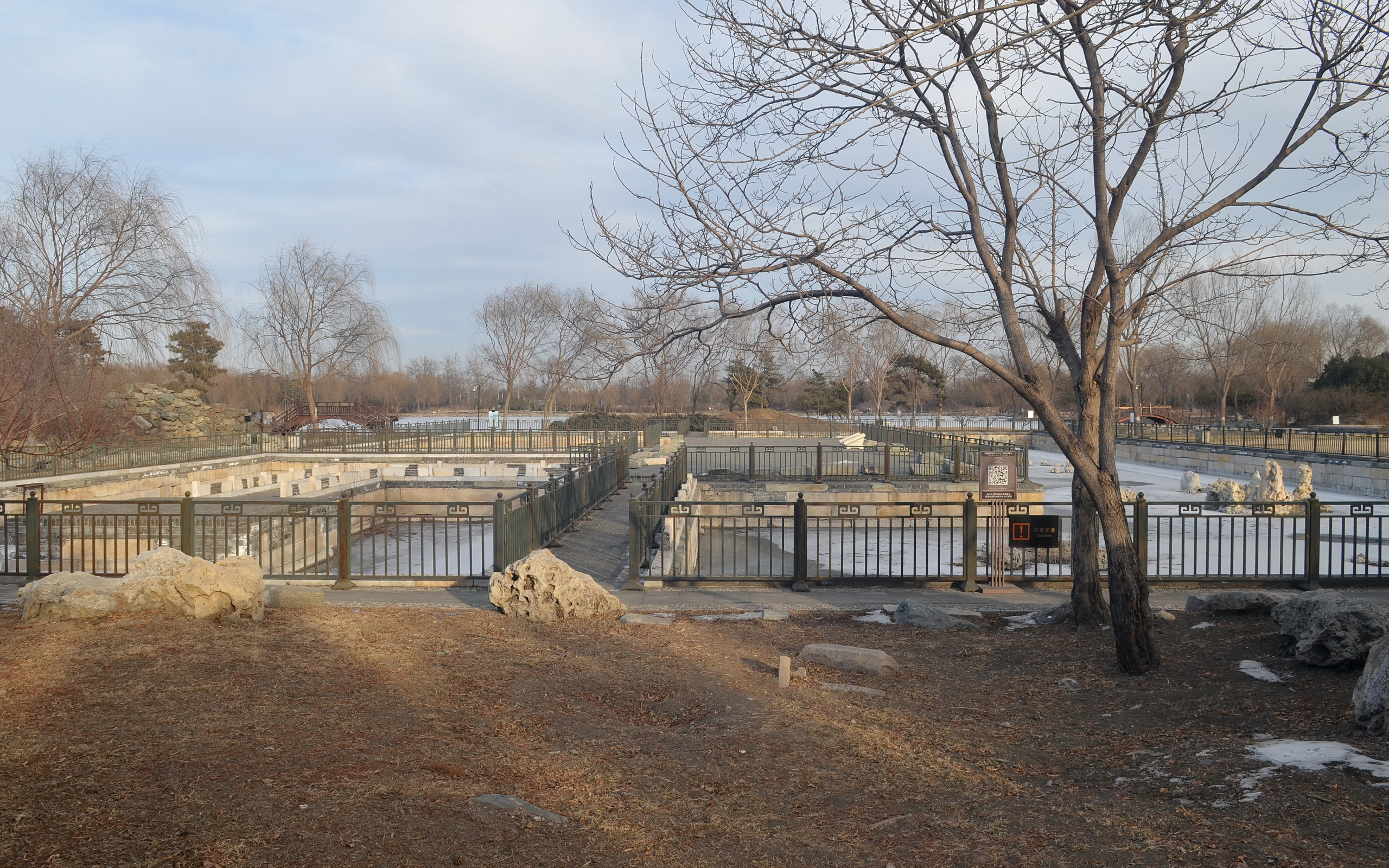
Ruins of The Magnanimous World (坦坦荡荡)

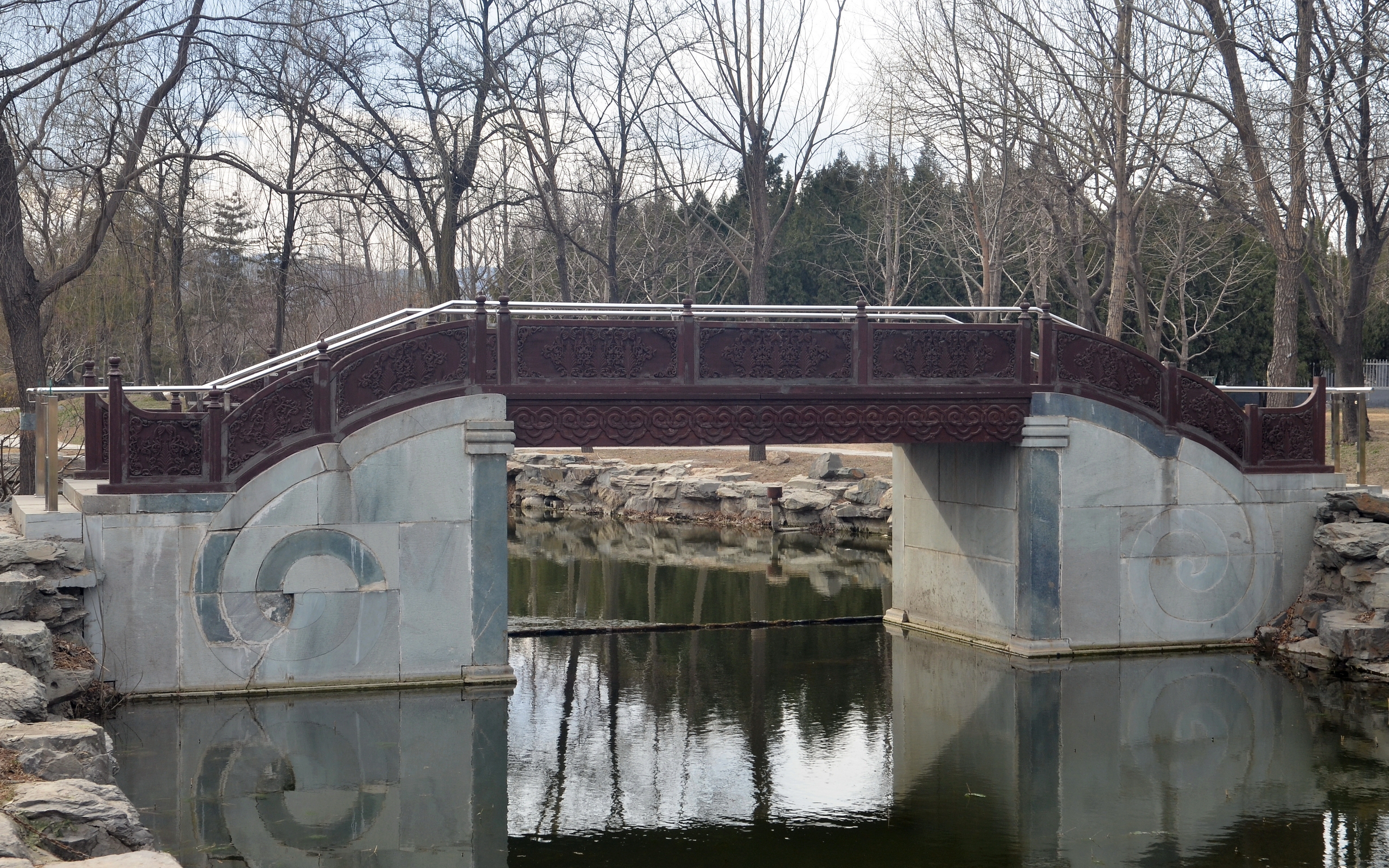
Ruyi Bridge (如意桥) in Yuanmingyuan

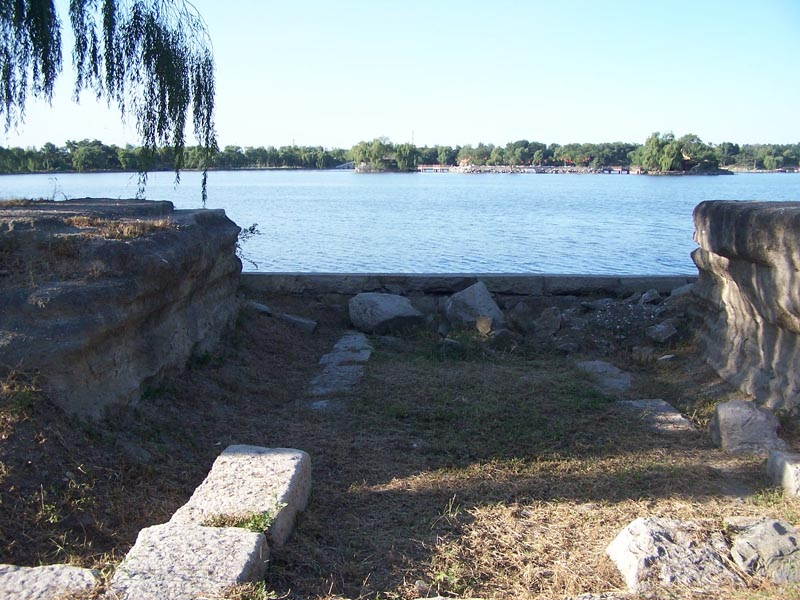
Fuhai Lake (福海) south bank (夹镜鸣琴)

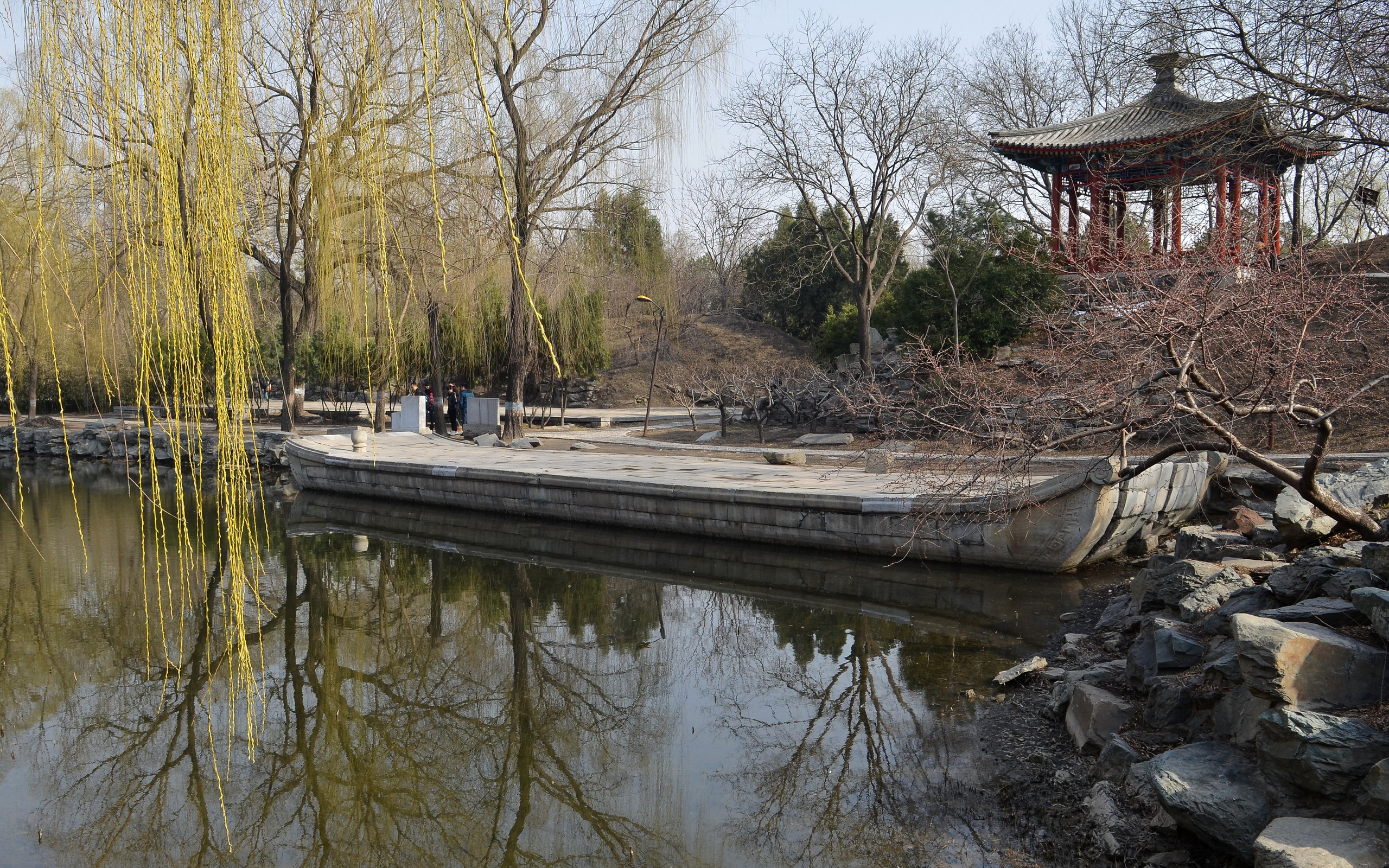
A stoneboat in the Yuanmingyuan (别有洞天)

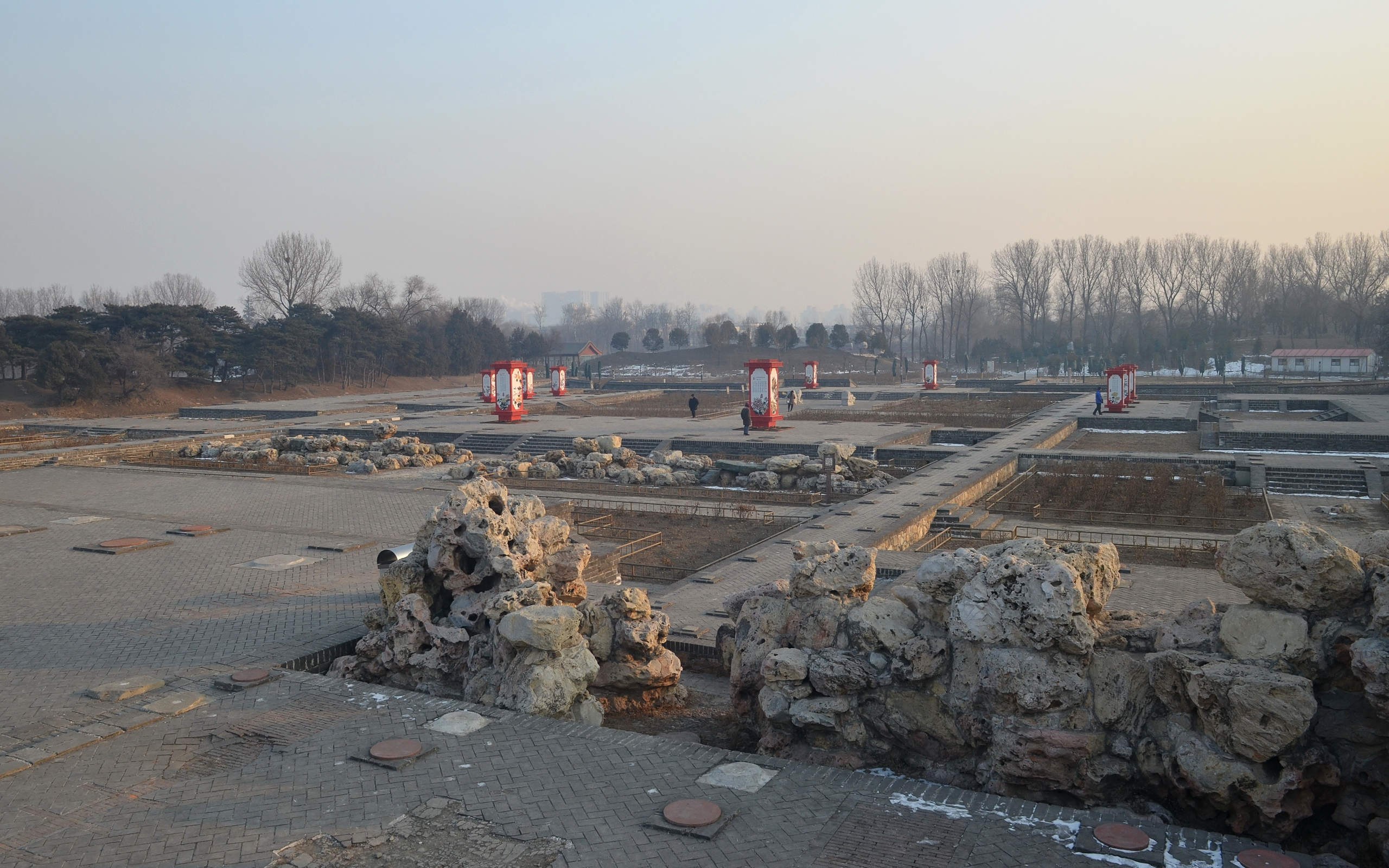
Ruins of Hanjingtang (含经堂)

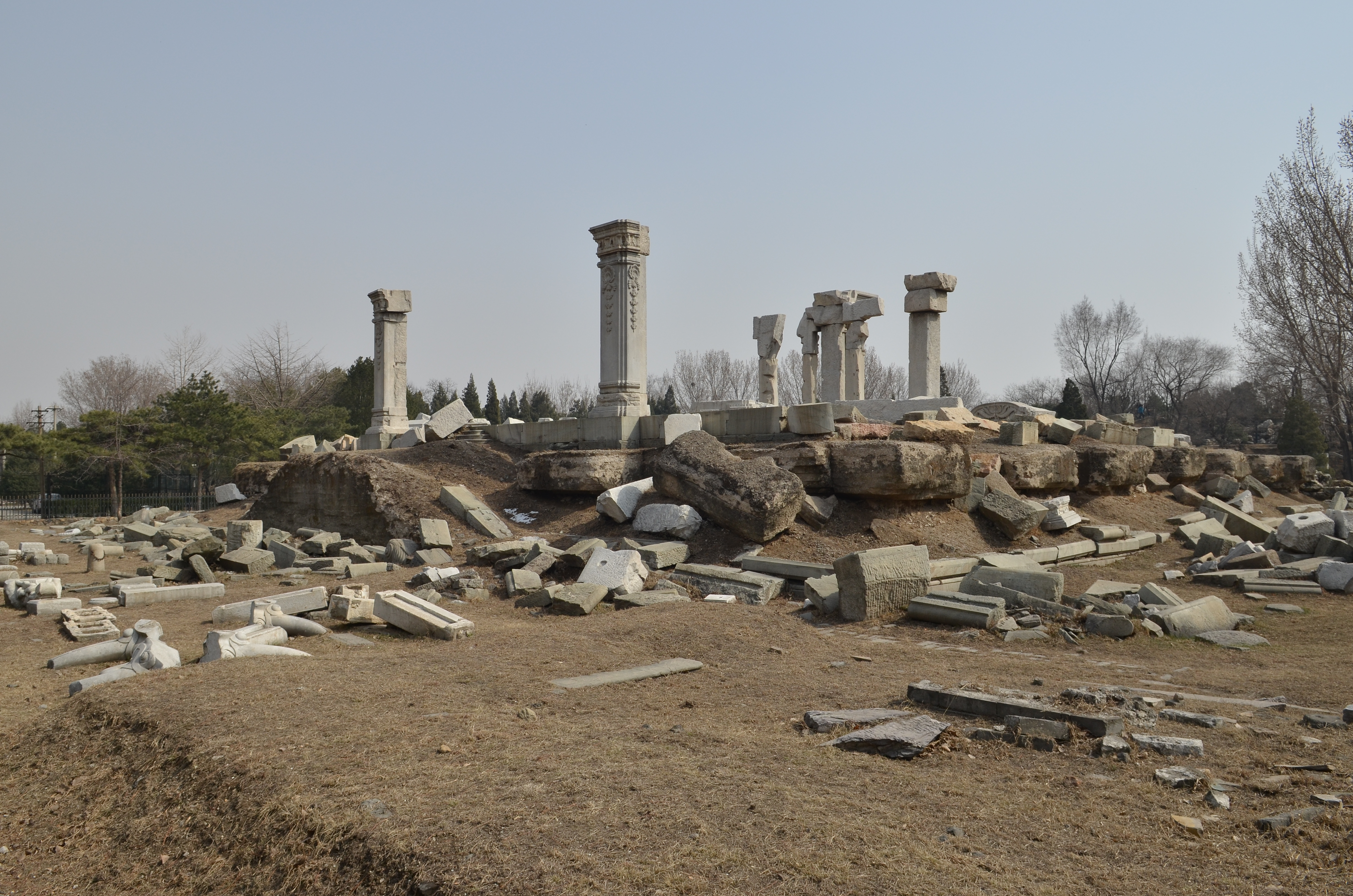
Yuanyingguan (远瀛观) Ruins North side

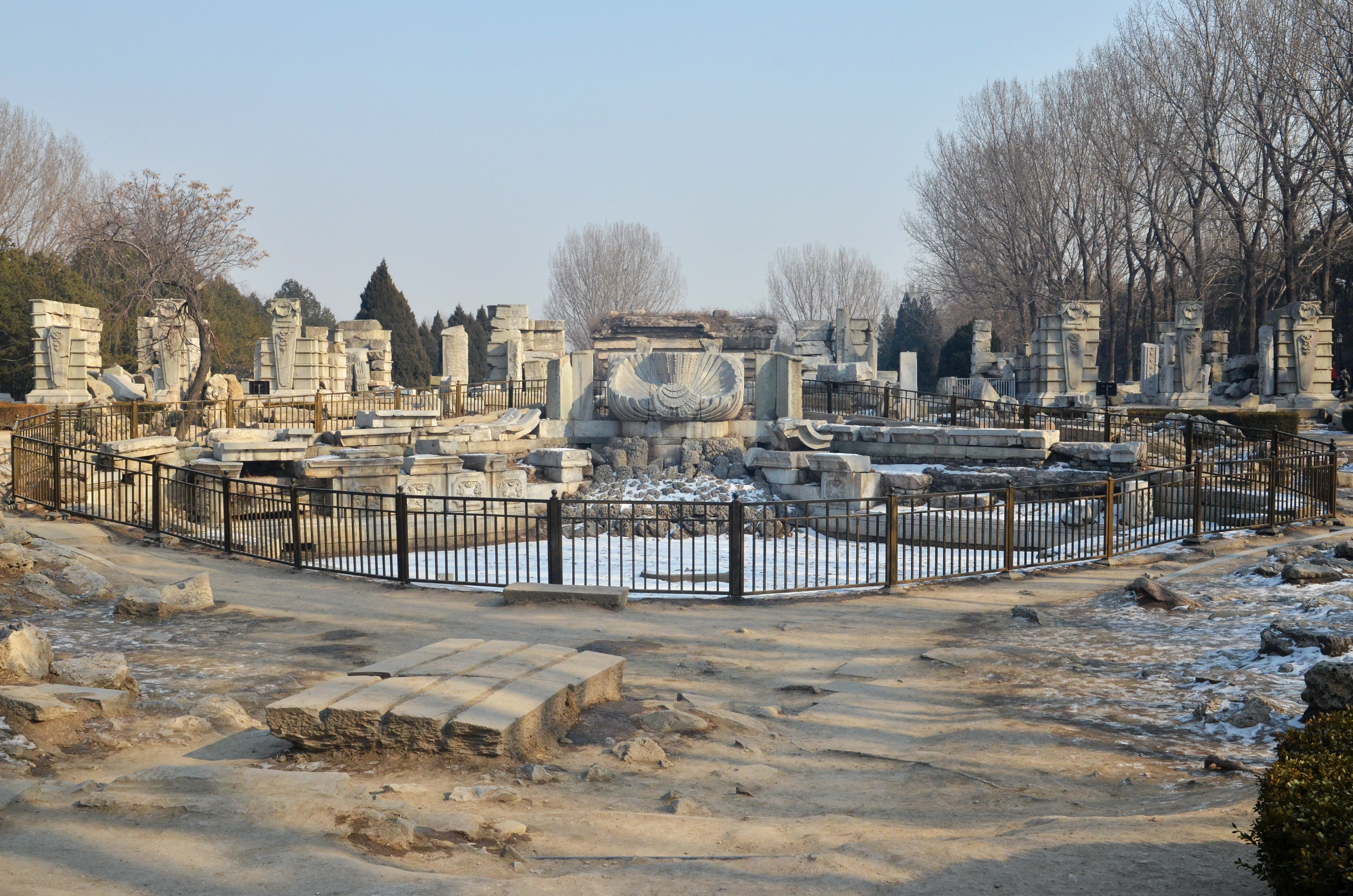
Ruins of Haiyantang

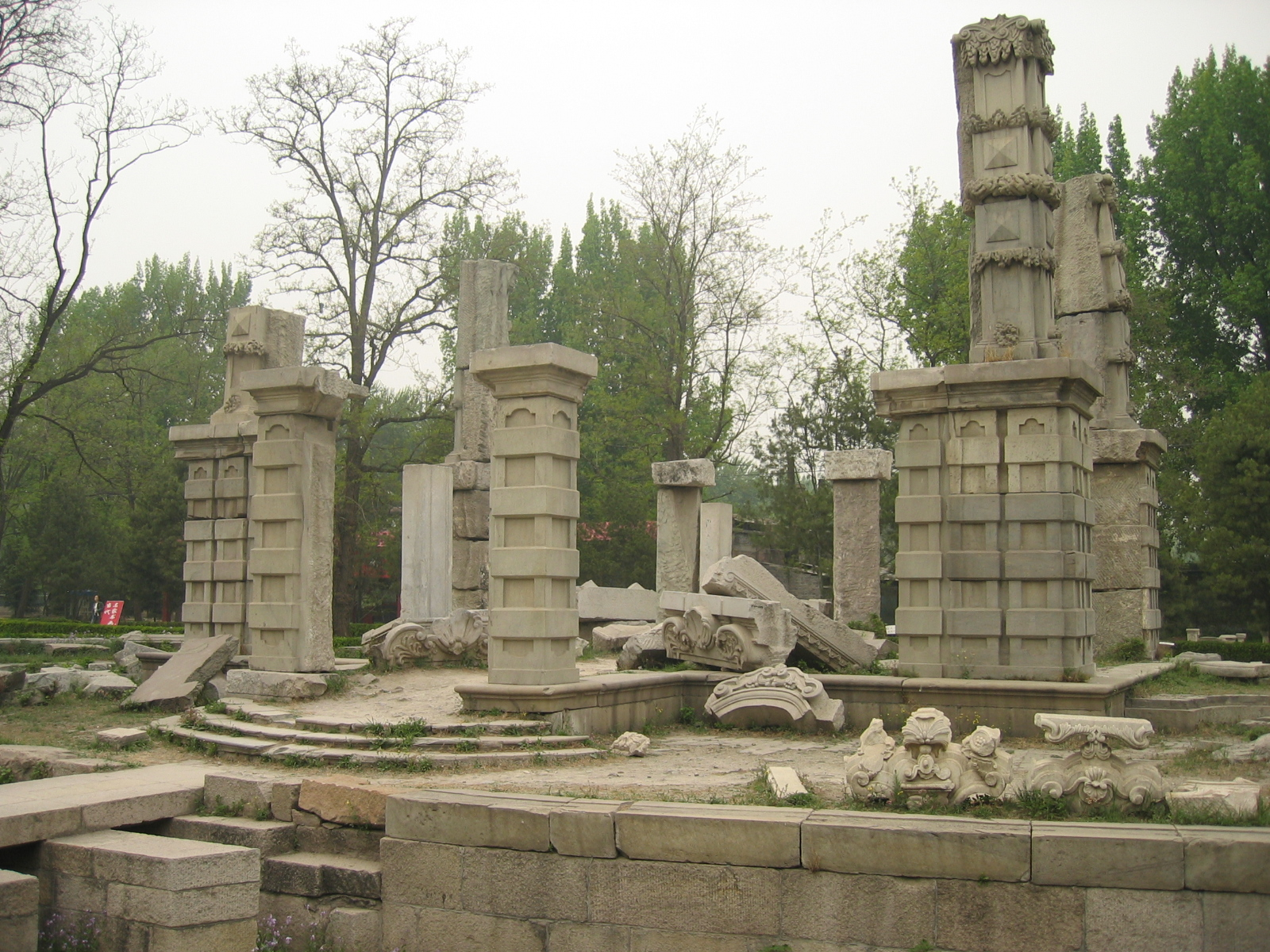
Ruins of the Fangwaiguan (方外观)

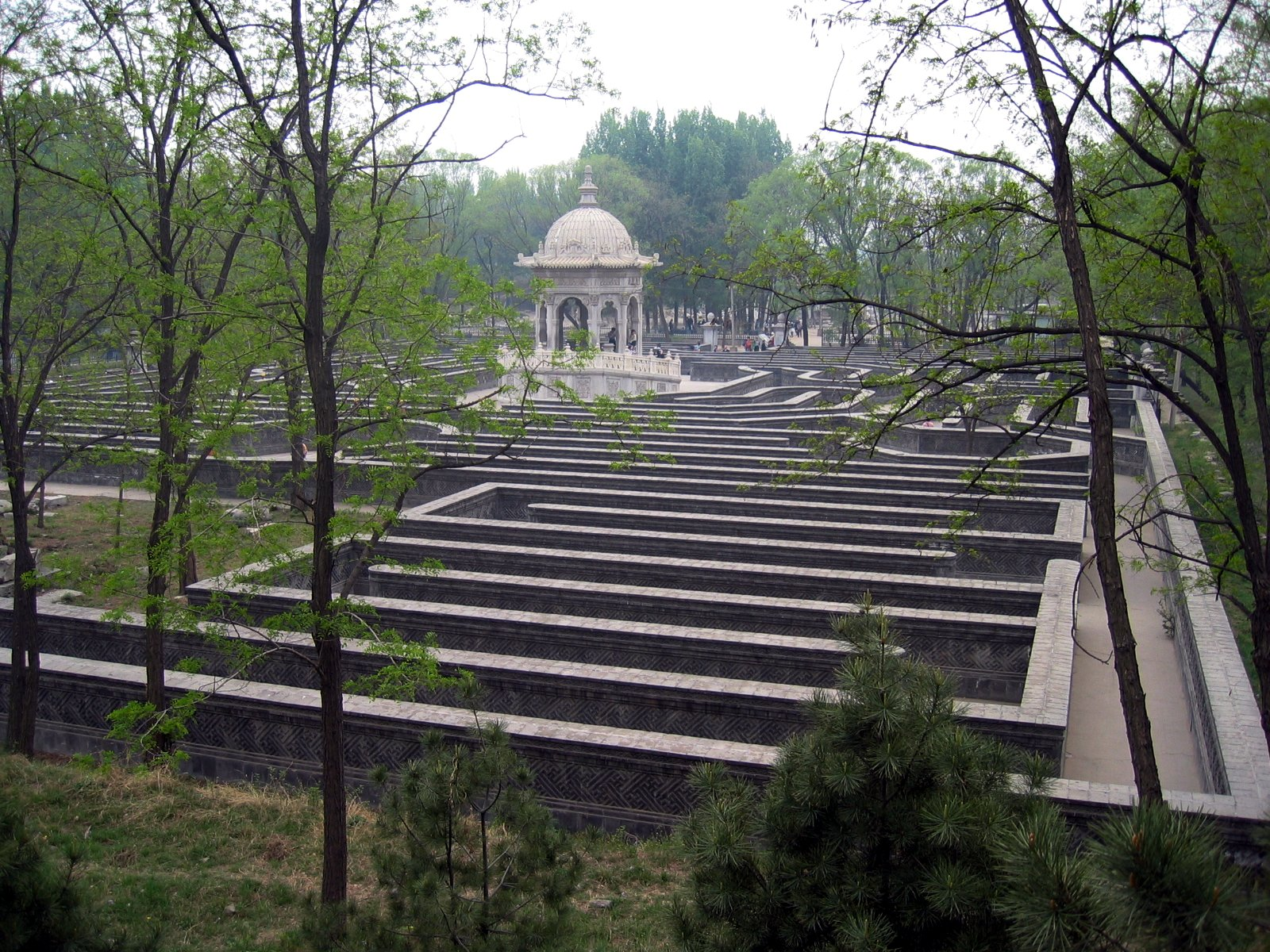
Restored Huanghuazhen (黄花阵/万花阵) in the Western Mansions (西洋楼) area

== See also ==
- Century of humiliation
- Flashman and the Dragon—A historical novel based on the events around the destruction of 1860
- Old Summer Palace bronze heads
- History of Beijing
- Kyoto Imperial Palace
