= Ayusi =

Qing dynasty military officer

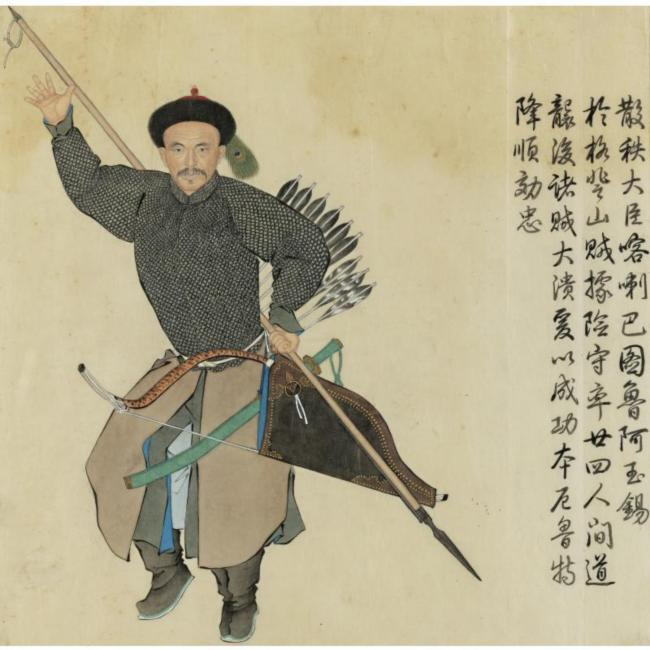
Portrait of Ayusi

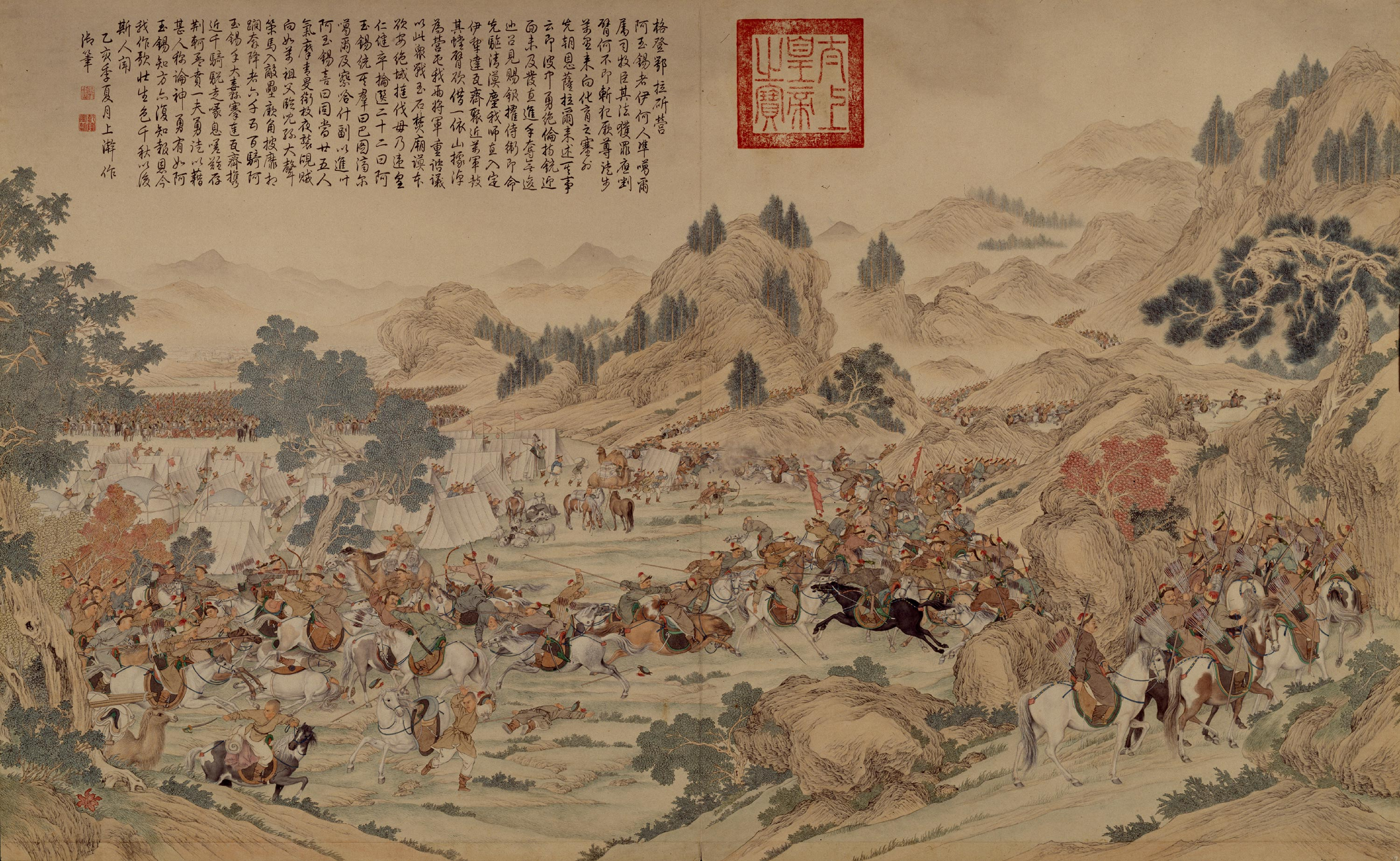
"Storming of the Camp at Gädän-Ola", a scroll depicting a raid in 1755 in which Ayusi, having gone to the Chinese side, attacks Dawa achi's camp on Mount Gadan. Painting by Giuseppe Castiglione.

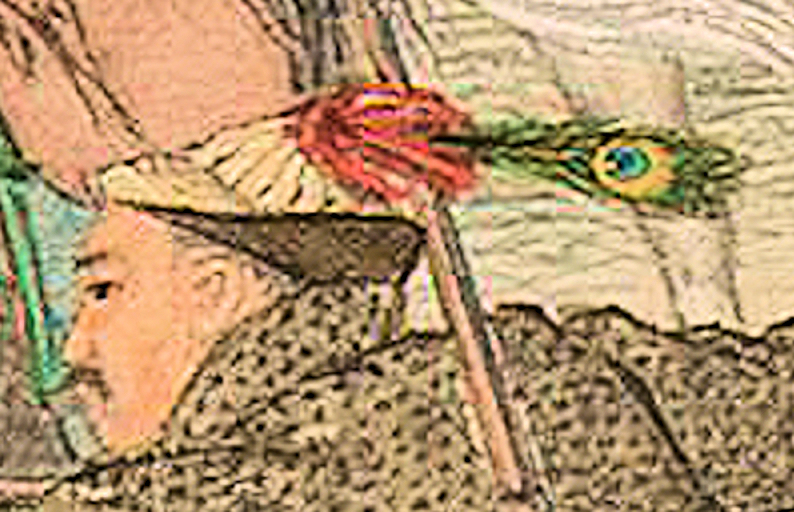
Ayusi's headgear

Ayusi (Manchu: ᠠᠶᡠᠰᡳ, Möllendorff: Ayusi, Abkai: Ayusi; Mongolian: Аюуш; simplified Chinese: 阿玉锡; traditional Chinese: 阿玉錫; pinyin: Āyùxī) was a Dzungar officer of the Qing dynasty of China. He is best known for his achievements against the Dzungar Khanate. His achievements allowed the Qing dynasty to pacify northern Xinjiang.

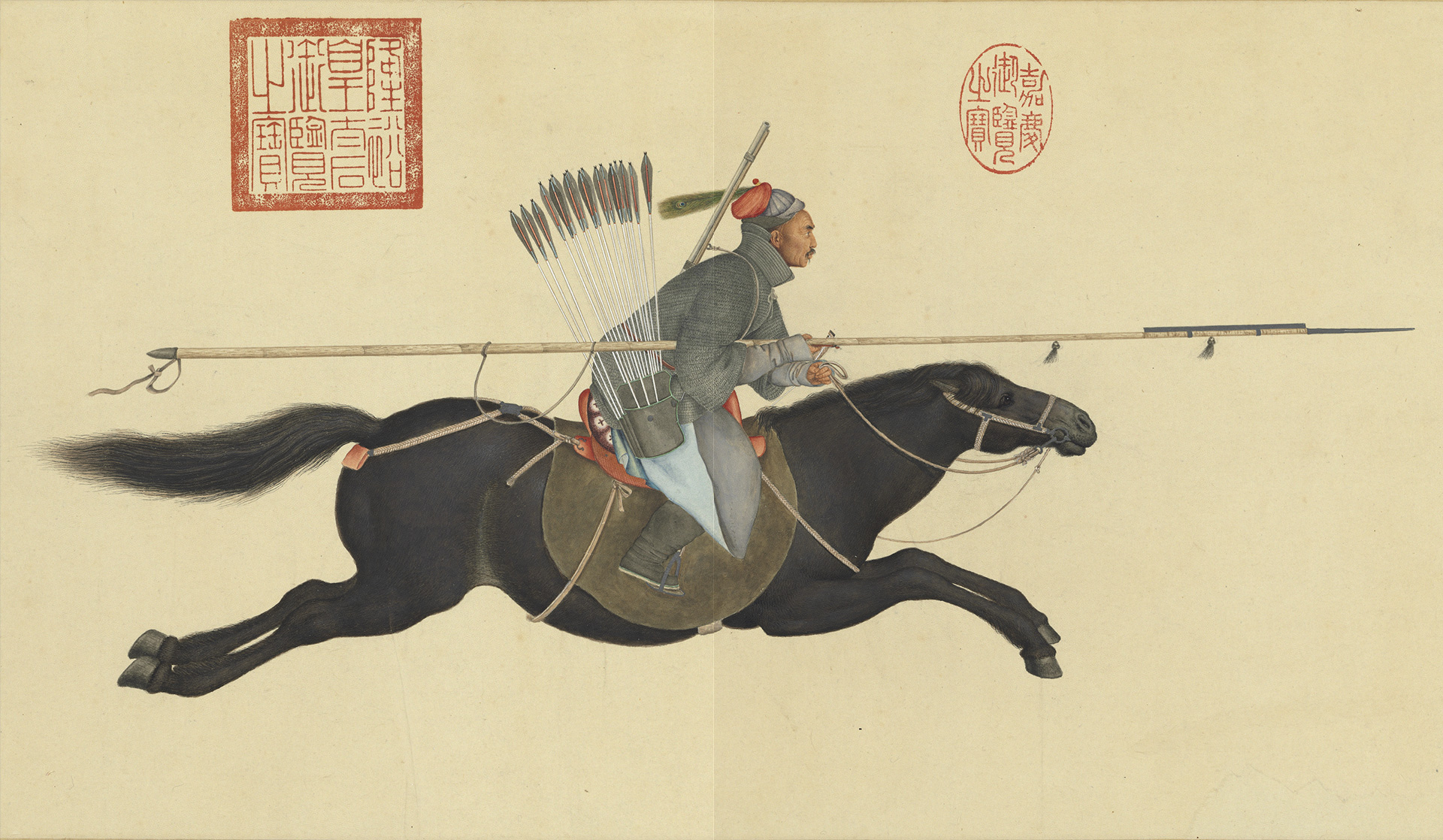
Ayusi Sweeping Bandits with a Lance, by Giuseppe Castiglione

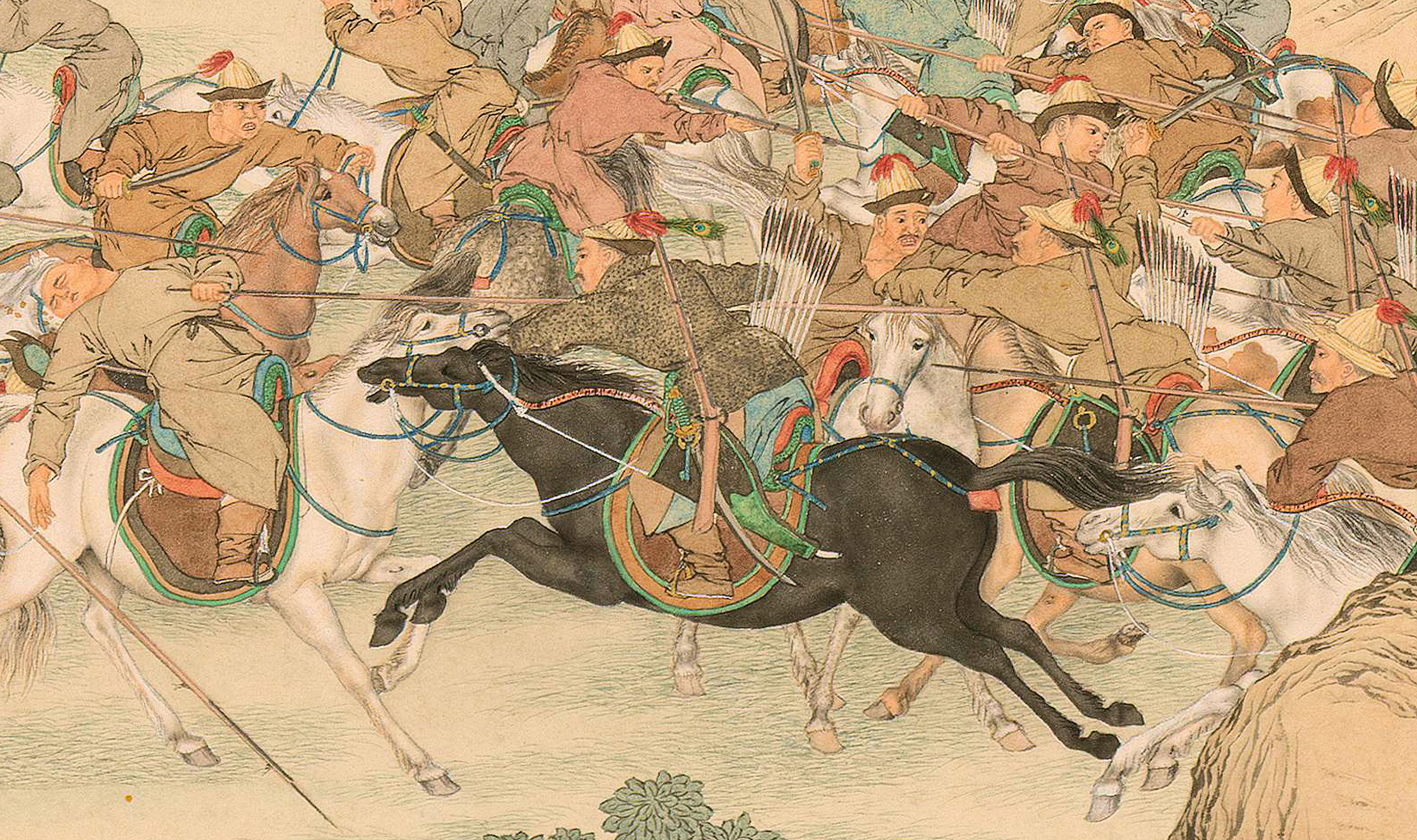
Ayusi leading the charge against the Dzungar camp at Gadan-Ola in 1755. By Giuseppe Castiglione. Ayusi's troops numbered around 20, and wore the Dzungar headgear with the addition of a green peacock feather for differentiation.
