= One Hundred Horses =

Chinese handscroll painting by Giuseppe Castiglione

- Artist: Giuseppe Castiglione
- Year: 1728
- Dimensions: 94.5 cm × 776 cm (37.2 in × 306 in)
- Location: National Palace Museum

One Hundred Horses
- Traditional Chinese: 百駿圖
- Simplified Chinese: 百骏图
Transcriptions
Standard Mandarin
- Hanyu Pinyin: tú chéng bǎi jùn

One Hundred Horses (simplified Chinese: 百骏图; traditional Chinese: 百駿圖; pinyin: bǎi jùn tú) is a 7.76 meters wide Qing dynasty silk and ink painting by Giuseppe Castiglione, known in China by his adopted name Lang Shining (郎世寧). It was painted in 1728 for the Yongzheng emperor.

It is currently held in the collection of the National Palace Museum in Taipei; a sketch of the scroll, created around 1723–1725, is in the collection of the Metropolitan Museum of Art in New York.

== History ==
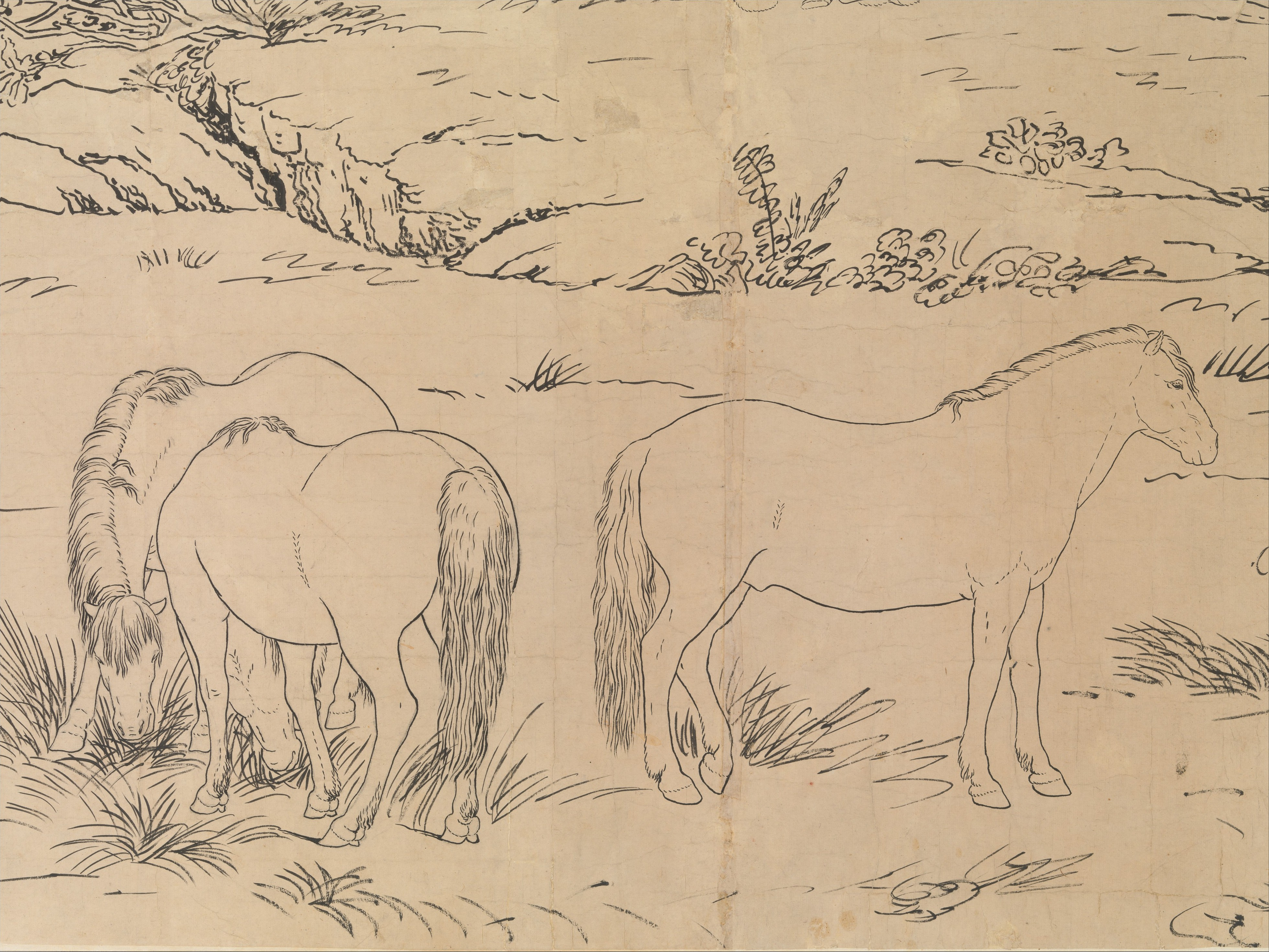
Part of the initial sketch

In the 18th century, court painters under China's Qing dynasty reached a new monumental scale of work and refinement of technique. One of the key figures in this process was the missionary Jesuit Giuseppe Castiglione, who came to China from Italy. Having previously worked on monumental projects in his homeland, the master created a new style in China that combined elements of Western realism with early Qing dynasty art.

Castiglione created a scroll featuring a hundred horses commissioned by the imperial court in 1724, where horses were one of the favourite themes. Subsequently, the theme of horses became one of the main subjects of Castiglione's work, and One Hundred Horses became his masterpiece. Art historians Cecil and Michael Burdeley wrote that before creating the scroll, Castiglione was given a sample; presumably, this source of inspiration was Li Gonglin's work Herd on Pasture, which depicted 1,200 horses and over 140 people. The sheer scale of the scroll suggests a European approach to the depiction. A sketch of the scroll, made several years earlier, was created in a traditionally European manner, despite using a brush. The landscape is drawn in a Western style, the figures of the horses are often depicted in a foreshortened perspective, and the plants are rendered with spontaneous cross-hatching. Despite the work being created during the reign of the Yongzheng Emperor, he never saw the completed work, and it was his successor, the Qianlong Emperor, who declared it a masterpiece in 1735. Castiglione was also declared the chief court painter.

== Description ==
The work was created in 1728 during the reign of the Yongzheng Emperor. Numerous horses are depicted in various poses; some of them are peacefully resting on the riverbank, while others are energetically galloping. The horizon line is located at two-thirds of the total height of the image, creating a full and voluminous perception of the painting's space. Trees, vegetation, and other elements of the landscape are rendered in proper proportions in perspective, contributing to the sense of space. Castiglione's painting style differs from traditional Chinese art techniques; using dark and light tones, the artist creates volumetric objects and chiaroscuro. The forms of the horses themselves are defined through lines and areas of colour; nevertheless, Castiglione consciously chose not to create more contrasting shadows on the horses, blending features of two different painting traditions.

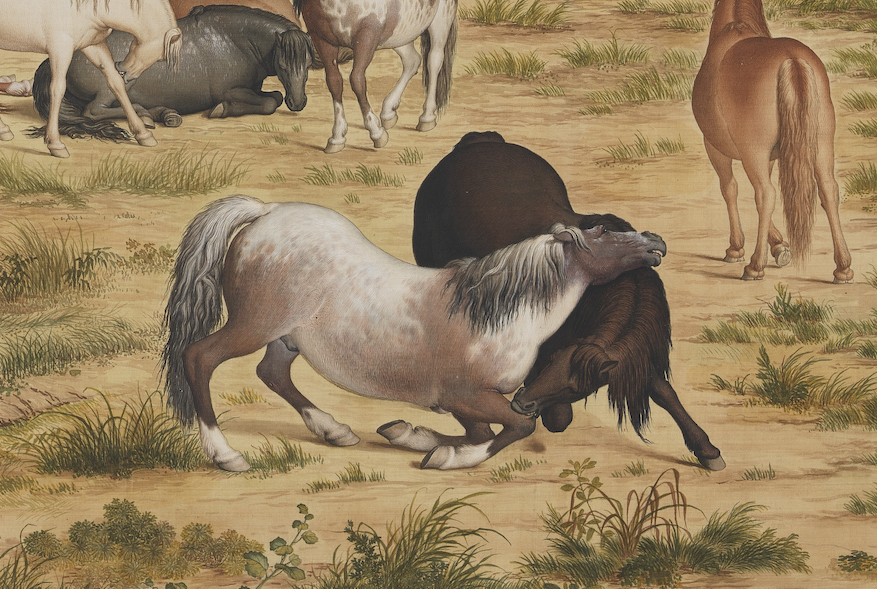
Detail of stallions fighting

The movement in the painting is created from right to left. On the right edge of the scroll, an old pine tree is depicted. On the left edge, three horses have crossed the river, and all the others follow them. Perspective is created through different planes, with horses shown at various distances from the viewer, engaged in different activities. The farthest plane is rendered in light, almost transparent tones. Among the innovative features, one can note the partially nude figure of a horse driver in the background—previously, in Chinese painting, the nude human body had not appeared and was considered almost marginal. In the sketch, Castiglione depicted two nude figures, but due to different approaches to depictions of nudity in Chinese culture as compared to Italian culture, he left only the one that draws less attention.

While incorporating innovative elements from Europe, the scroll also adheres to traditional Chinese canons. As the Chinese calligrapher and artist Dong Qichang (1555–1636) wrote:

Drawn figures should look at each other and converse. Flowers and fruits should face the wind and be moistened with dew. Birds should chirp, animals should run. The overall mood of the painting should rise above the real things... The sources of streams should be clearly indicated. With these qualities, even if the artist is not famous, his work will be considered the work of a great master.

The scroll also contains areas left unpainted, characteristic of Chinese painting. The trees in the painting are depicted in the Chinese manner, but with the use of shading. According to Chinese canons, the trees show roots, intricate and twisted trunks, and bark resembling scales. The trees chosen for the work are Buddhist symbols. The oak symbolizes masculine strength, the willow humility, the pine longevity and resilience, the maple and its leaves represent abundance, and the sophora represents encounters with immortals, fertility, and good fortune. In the foreground, lingzhi mushrooms can be seen on the tree roots, which are a traditional motif in Chinese painting and were considered sacred.

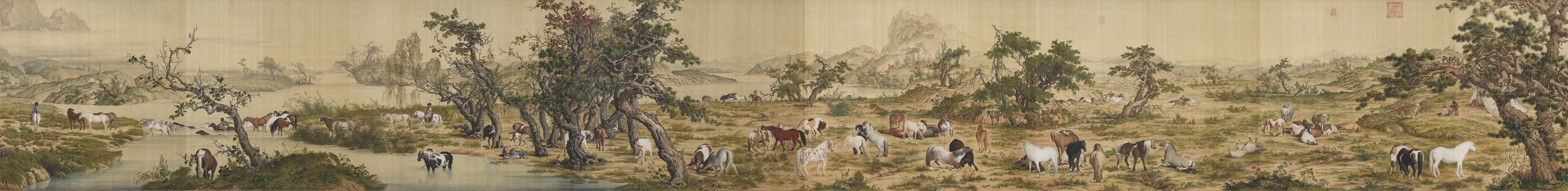
One Hundred Horses in a Landscape
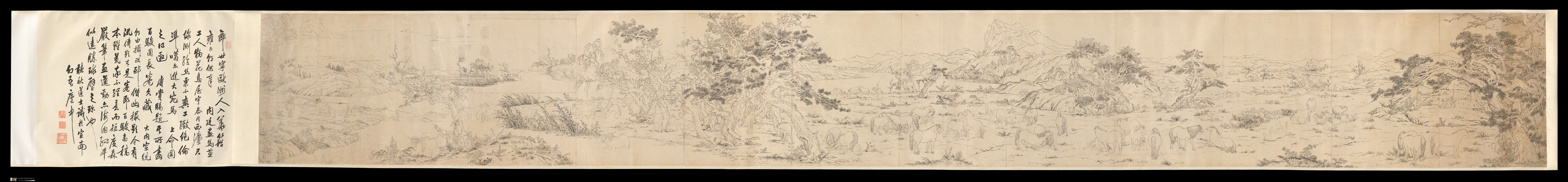
Castiglione's preparatory drawing for One Hundred Horses
