= Forty Scenes of the Yuanmingyuan =

Painting series

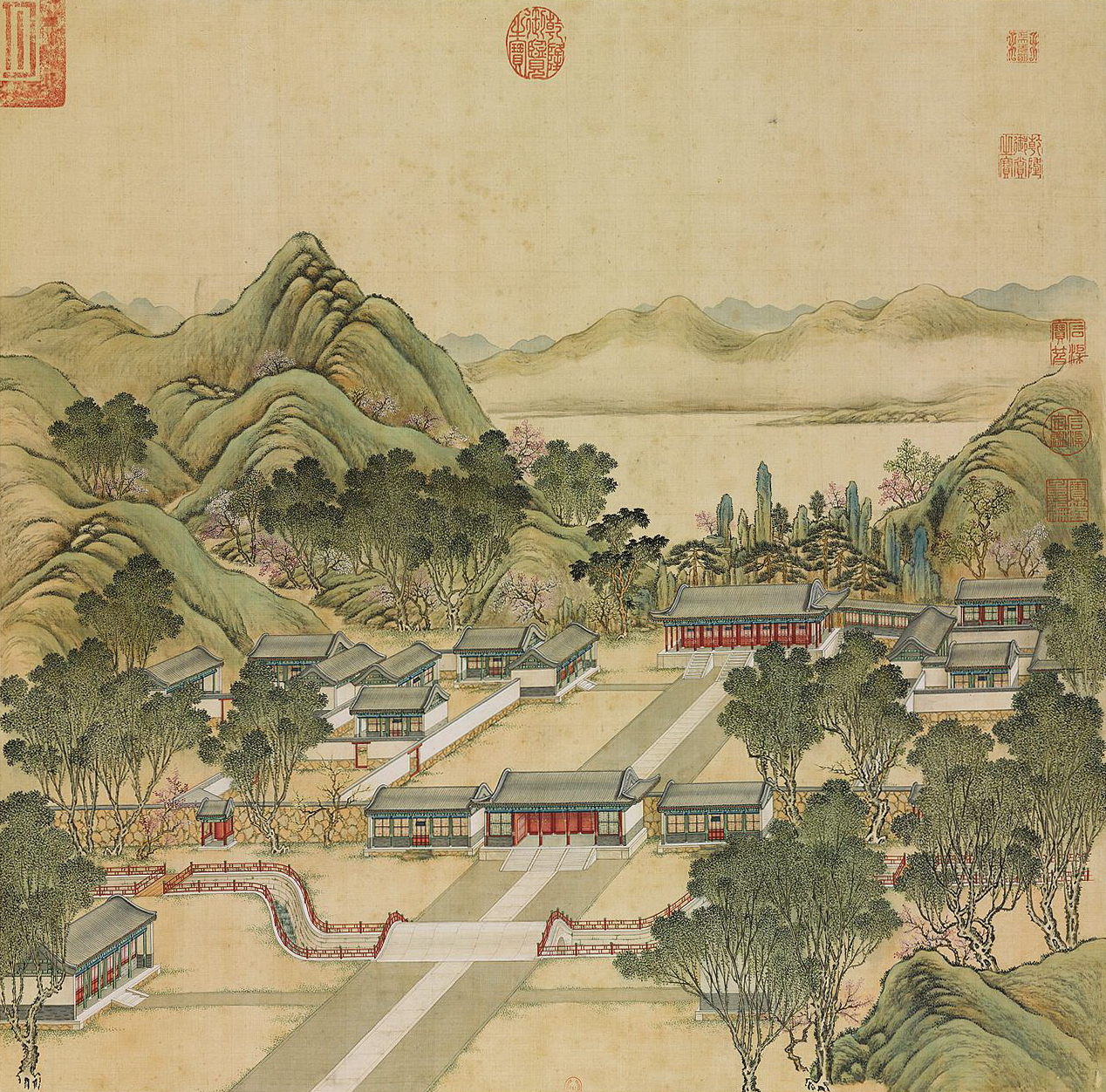
- Year: 1744
- Location: France

The painting series Forty Scenes of the Yuanmingyuan (Chinese: 圓明園四十景圖) depicts historically recognized vistas in the Old Summer Palace in Beijing, China. In 1744, the Qianlong Emperor commissioned a set of forty paintings from two court artists, Shen Yuan (沈源) and Tangdai, and a calligrapher, Wang Youdun. The paintings, currently in the collection of Bibliothèque nationale de France, are among the few remaining visual records of the Yuanmingyuan prior to the sack by French and British troops in 1860. Twenty-four out of the forty garden scenes depicted in paintings were lost in the destruction of 1860, the remaining scenes have been lost over time since then.

== Gallery ==
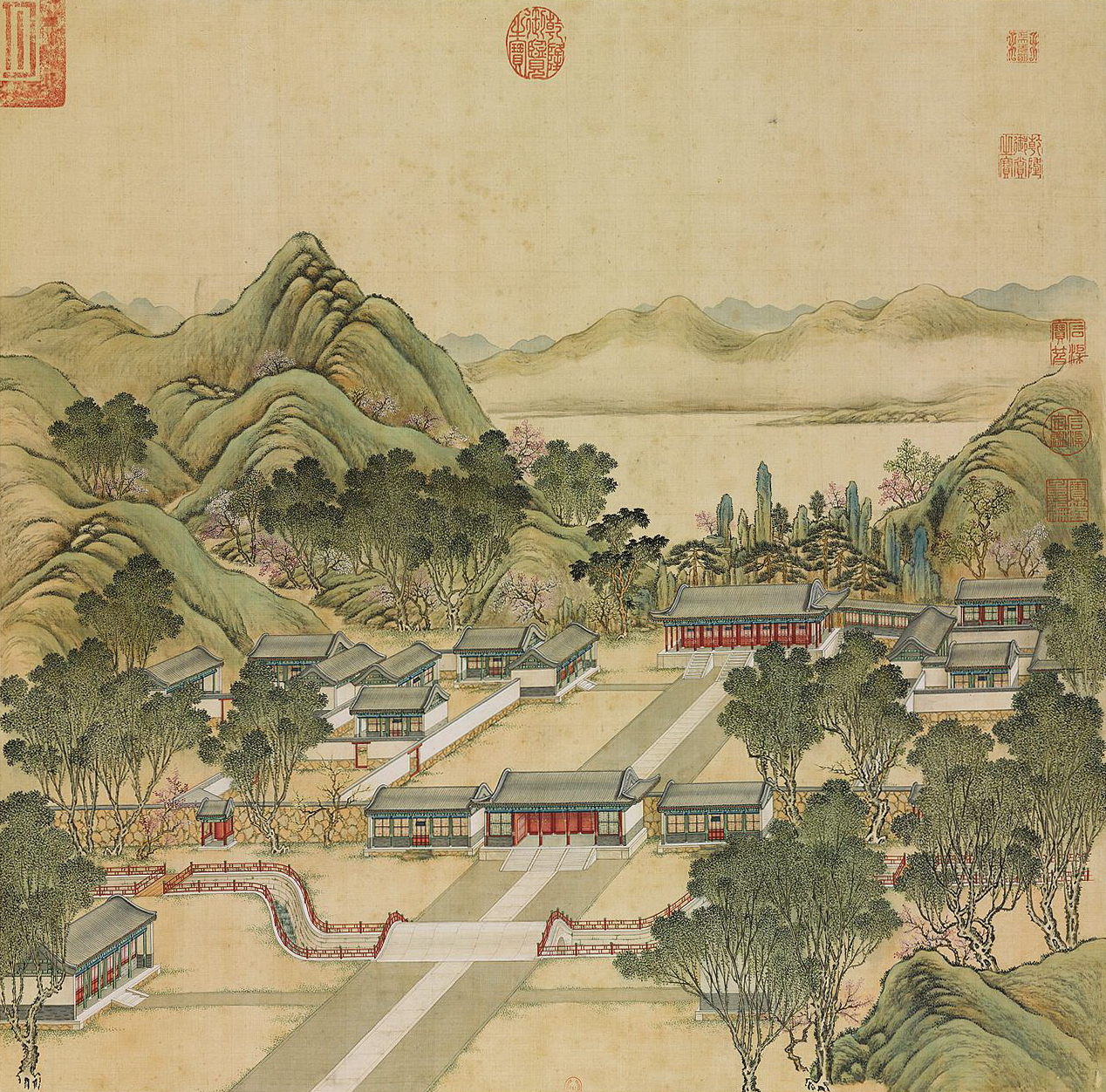
Hall of Rectitude and Honor
Chinese: 正大光明; pinyin: Zhèngdà guāngmíng

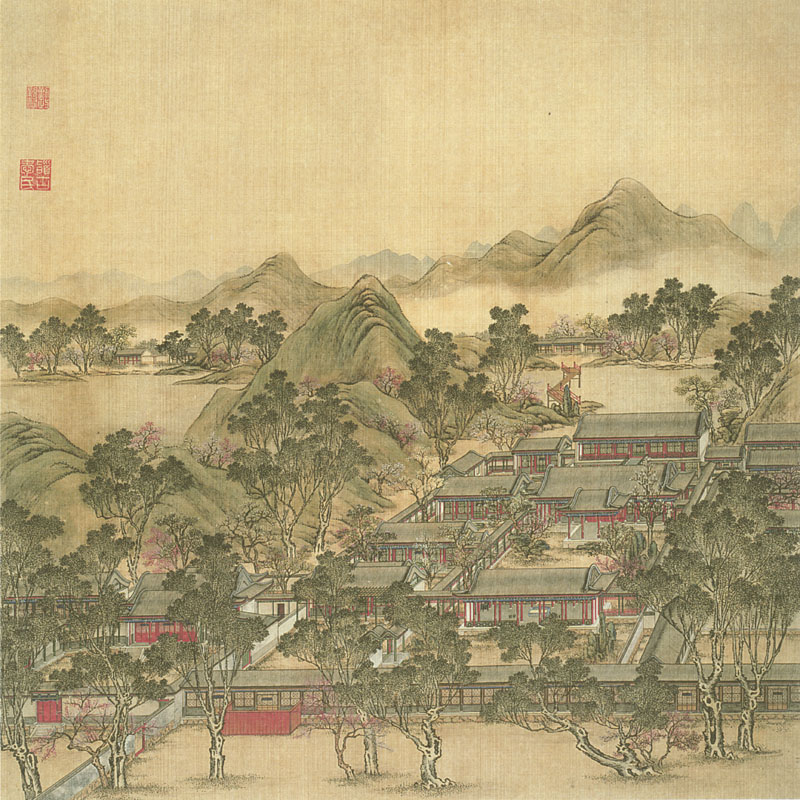
Diligent and Talented Government
Chinese: 勤政親賢; pinyin: Qínzhèng qīnxián

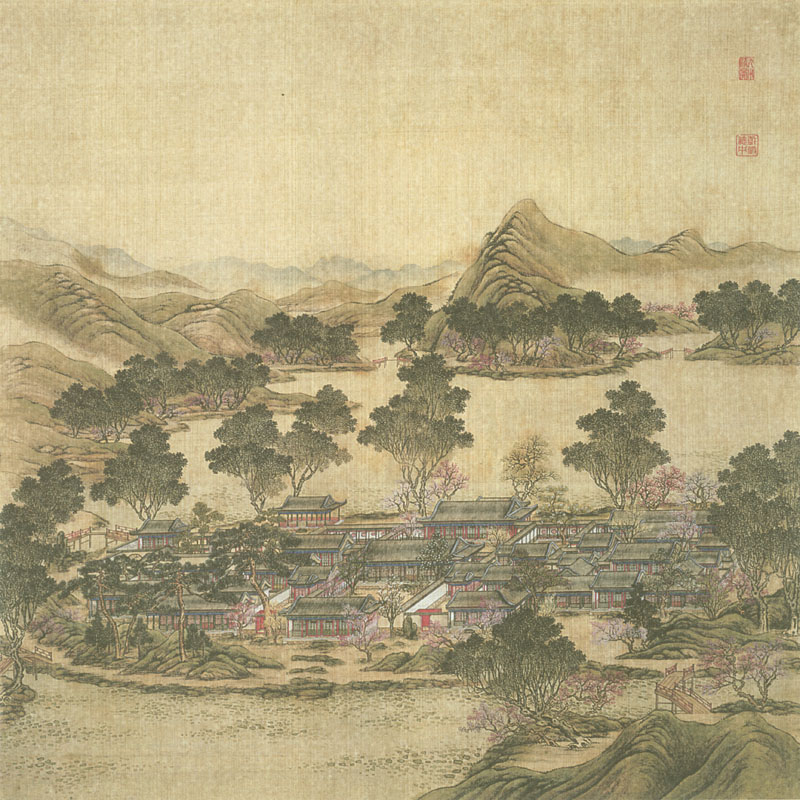
Nine Continents Clear and Calm (Emperor’s Private Residence)
Chinese: 九州清宴; pinyin: Jiǔzhōu qīngyàn

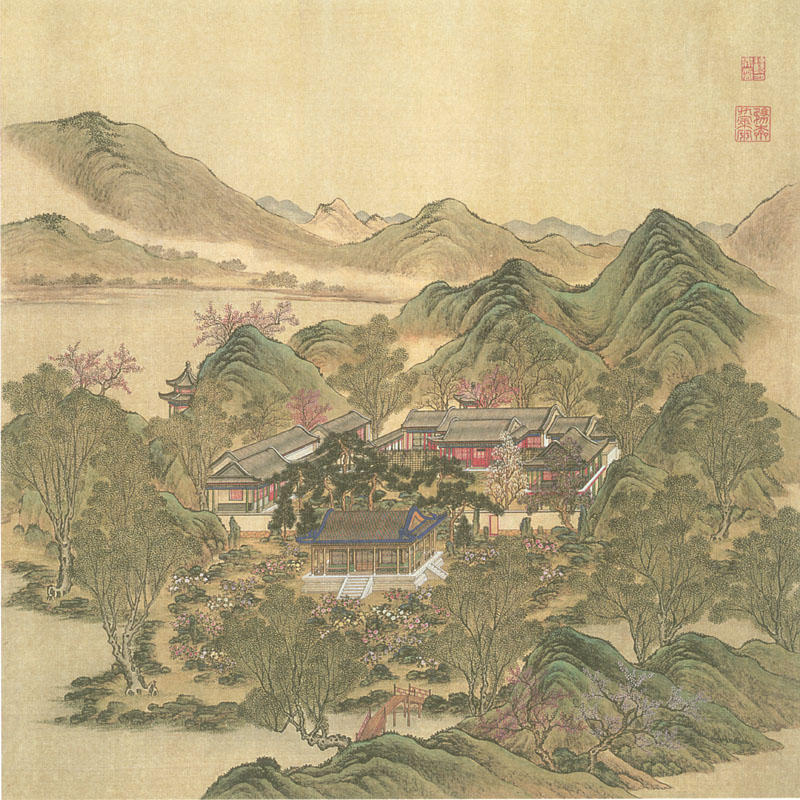
Engraved Moon and Unfolding Clouds
Chinese: 牡丹臺; pinyin: Mǔdān tái
Chinese: 鏤月開雲; pinyin: Louyue kaiyun

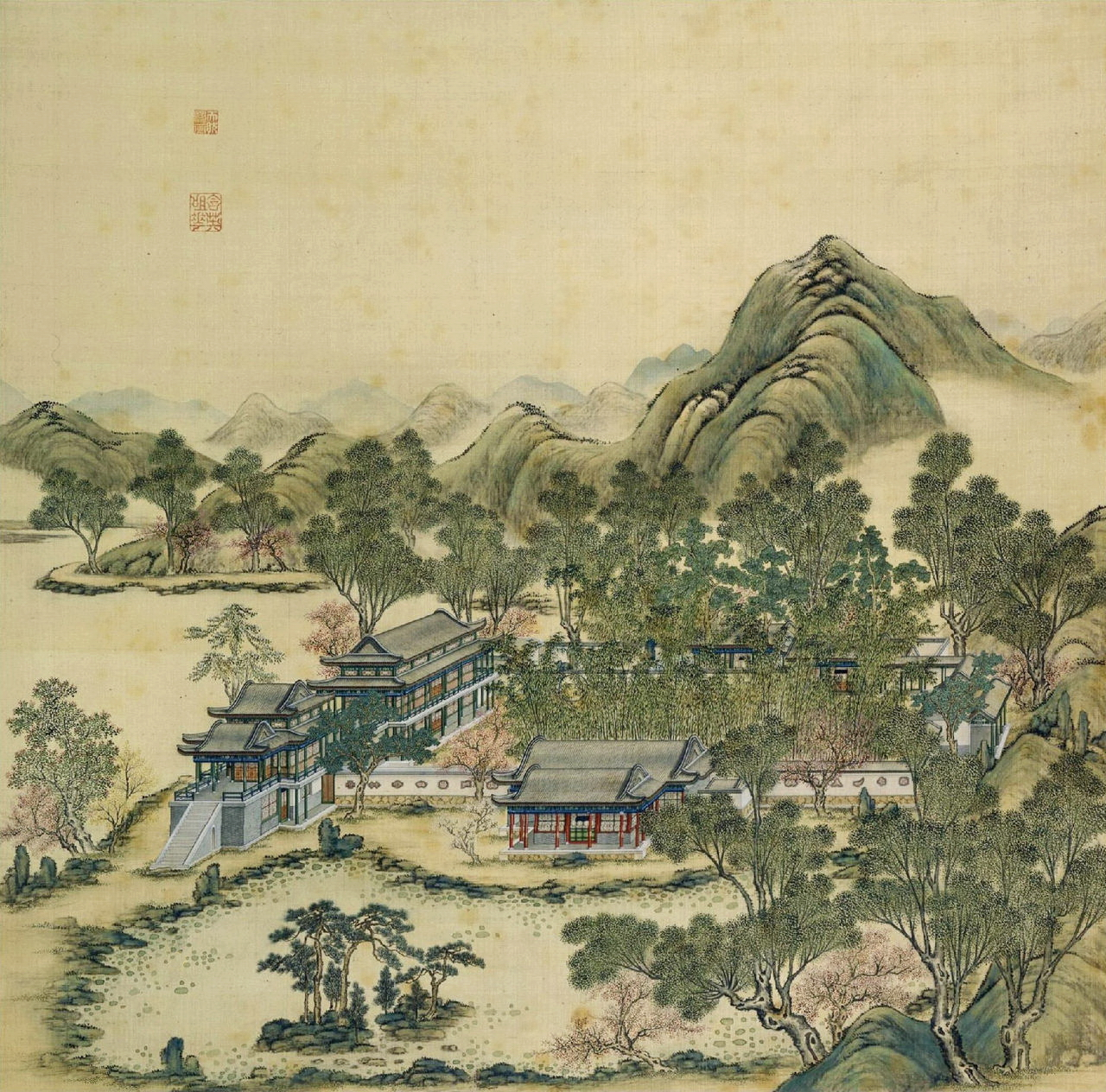
A Painting of Nature
Chinese: 天然圖畫; pinyin: Tiānrán túhuà

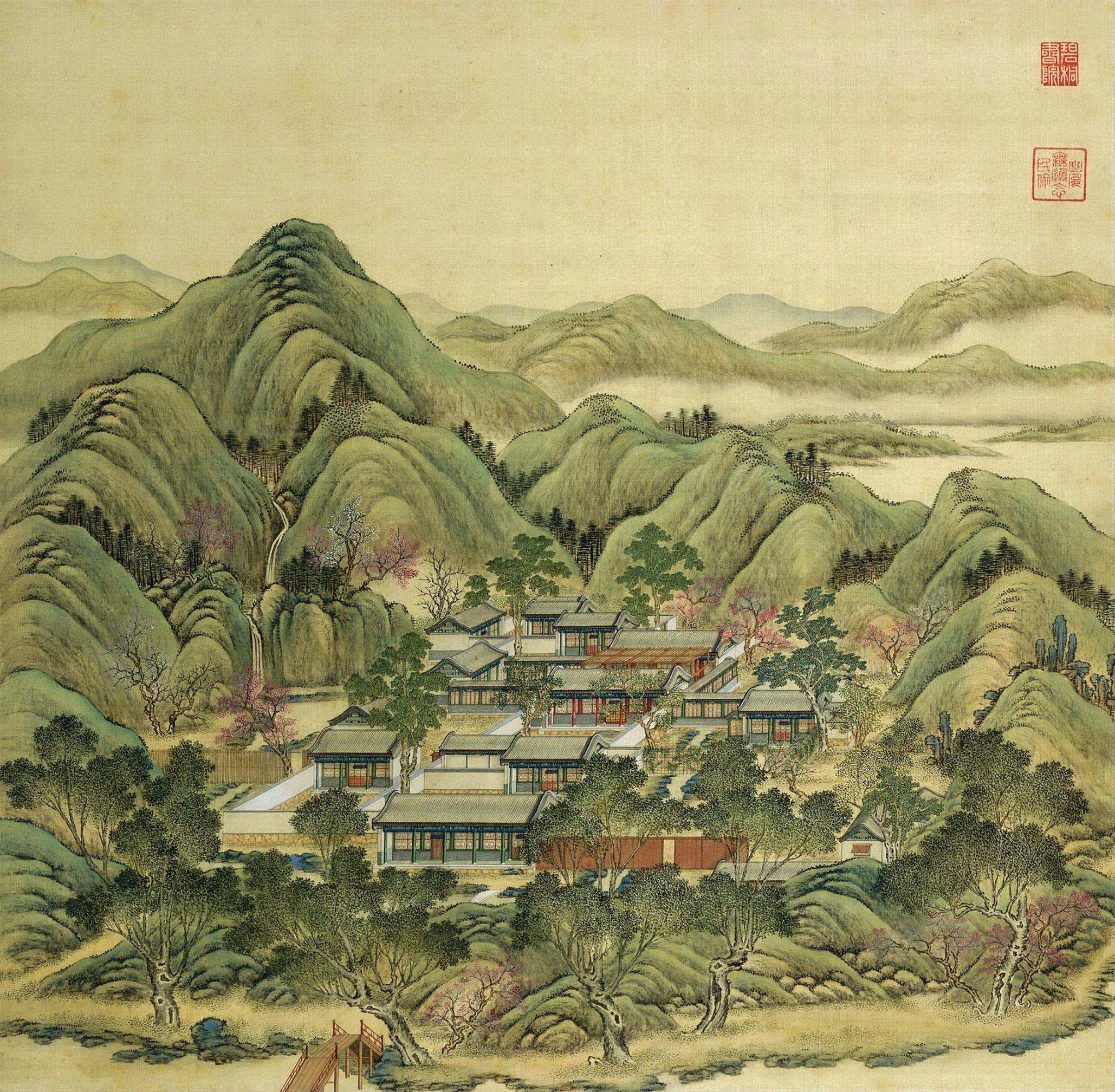
Green Wutong Tree Academy
Chinese: 碧桐書院; pinyin: Bìtóng shūyuàn

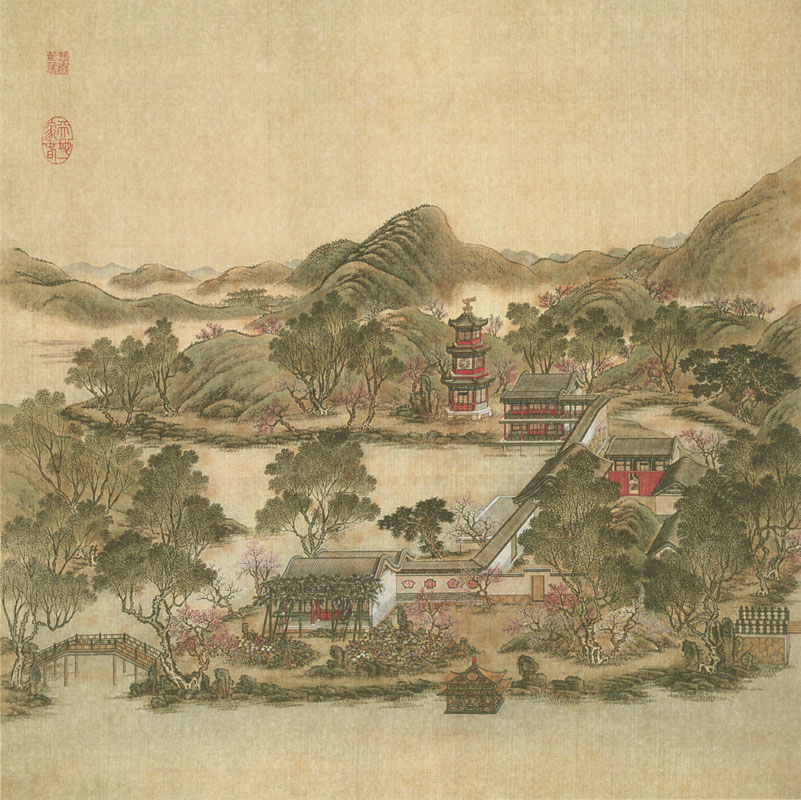
Merciful Clouds Protect All (Island of Shrines)
Chinese: 慈雲普護; pinyin: Cíyún pǔhù

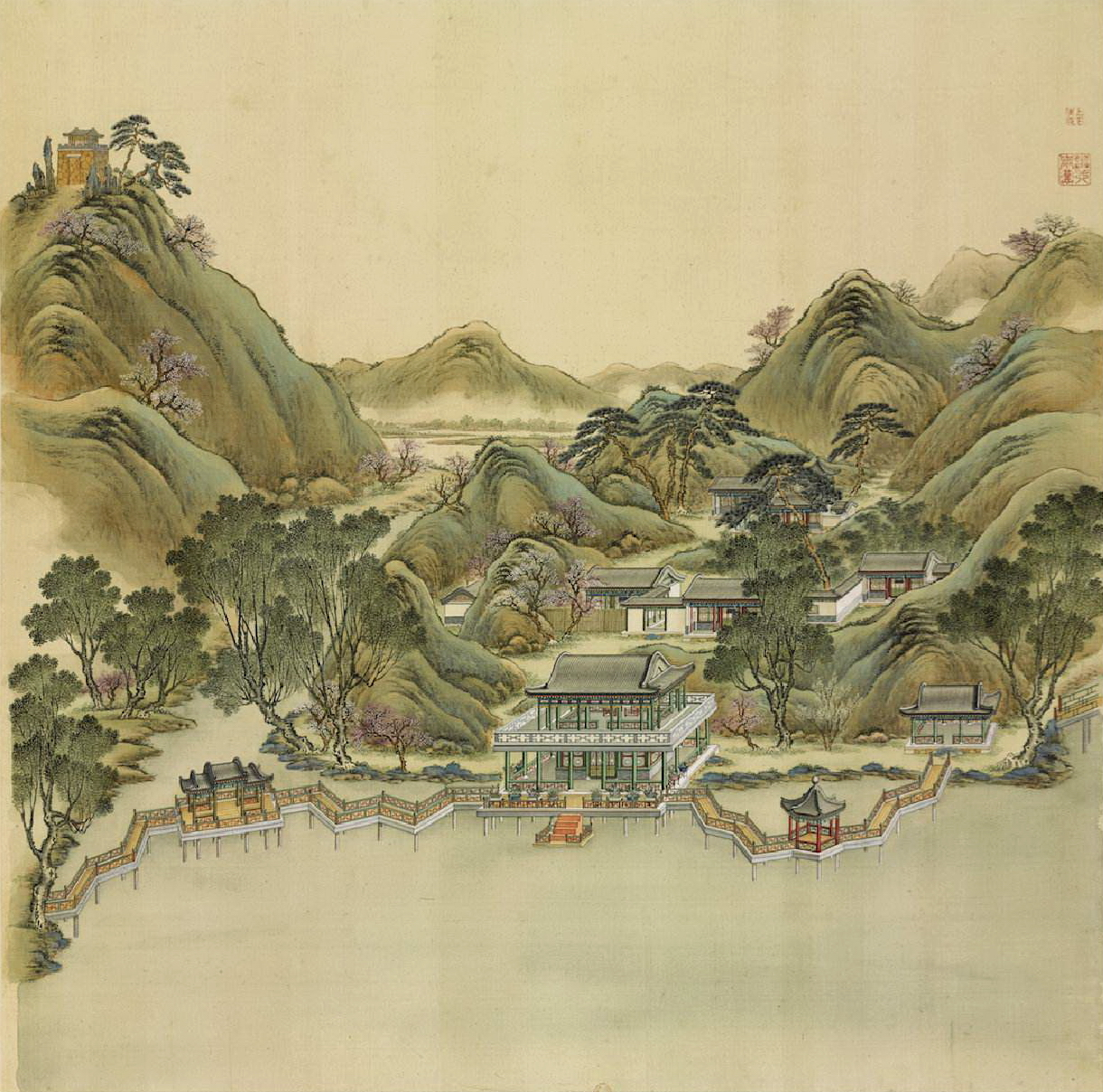
Heavenly Light Above and Below
Chinese: 上下天光; pinyin: Shàngxià tiānguāng

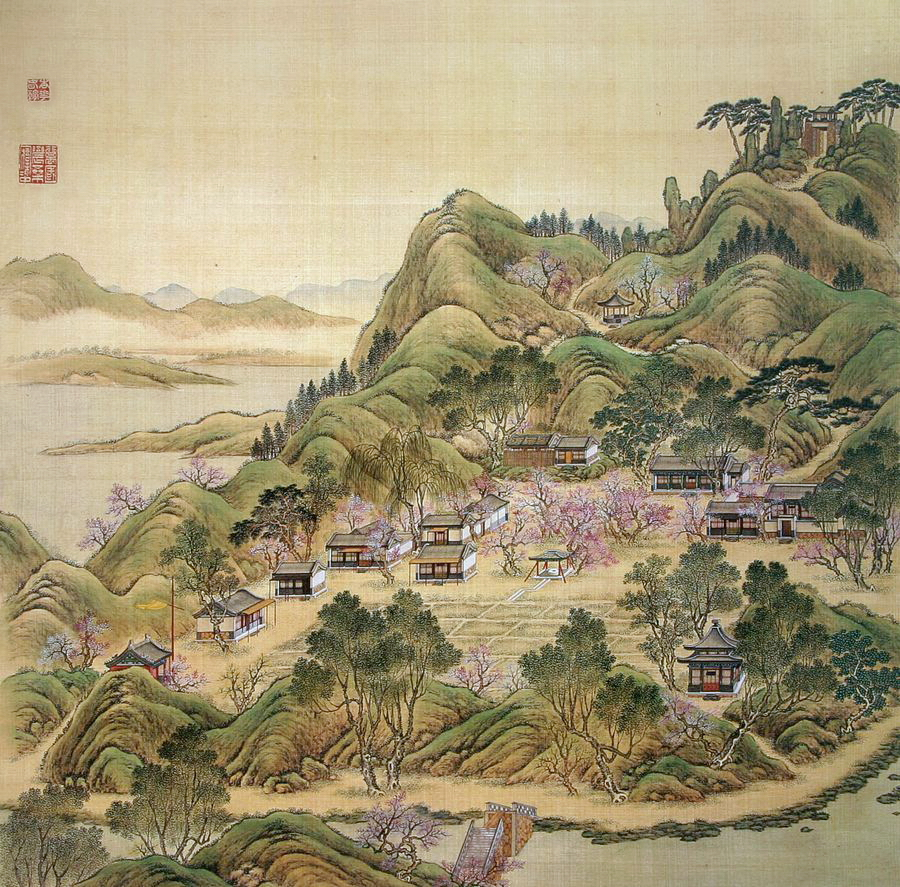
Apricot Blossom Spring Villa
Chinese: 杏花春館; pinyin: Xìnghuā chūnguǎn

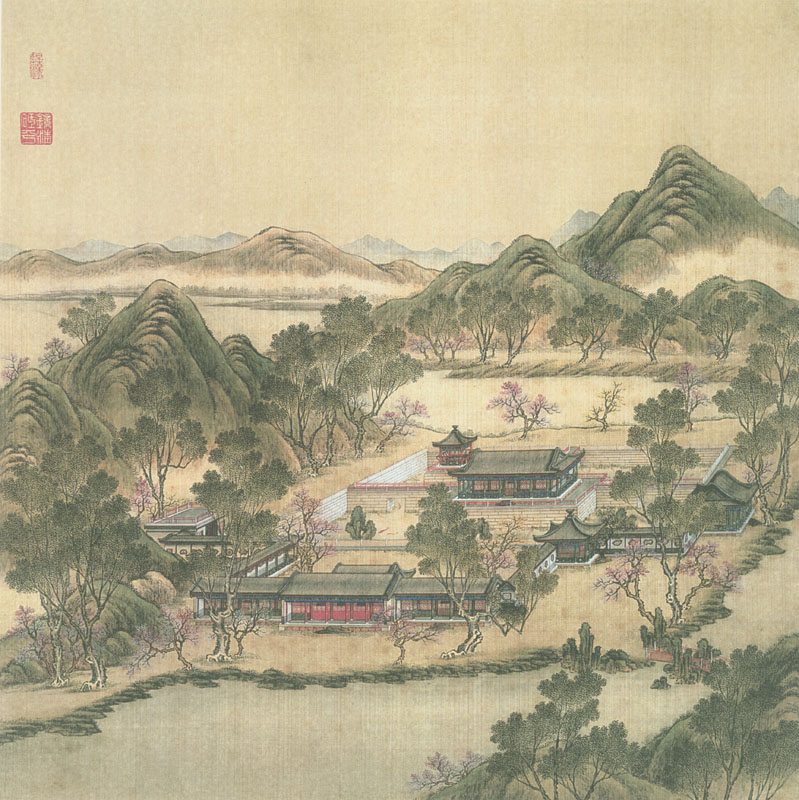
The Magnanimous World
Chinese: 坦坦蕩蕩; pinyin: Tǎntǎn dàngdàng

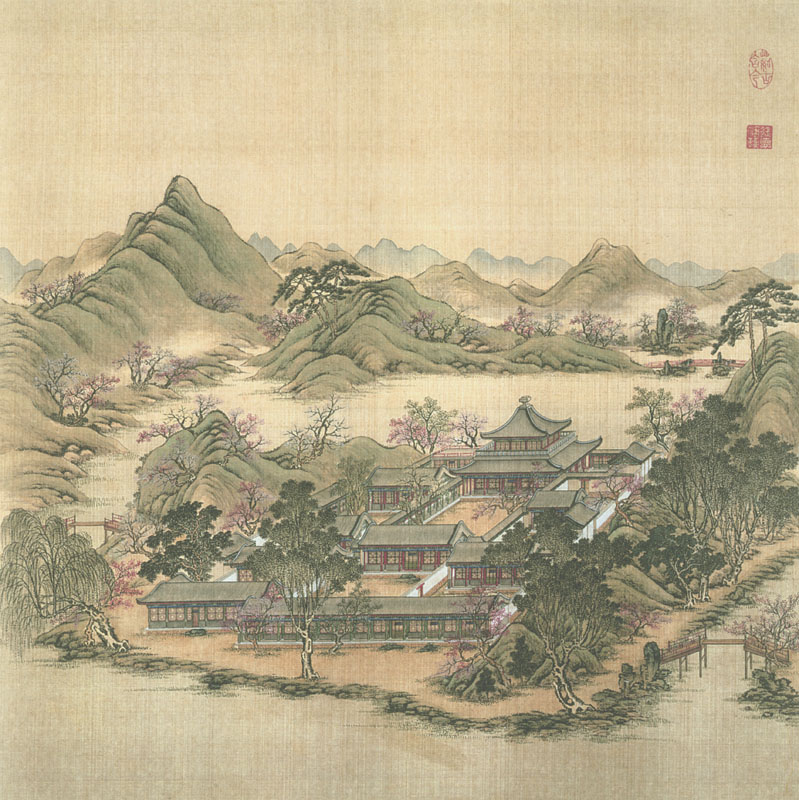
Harmony of the Present with the Past
Chinese: 茹古涵今; pinyin: Rúgǔ hánjīn

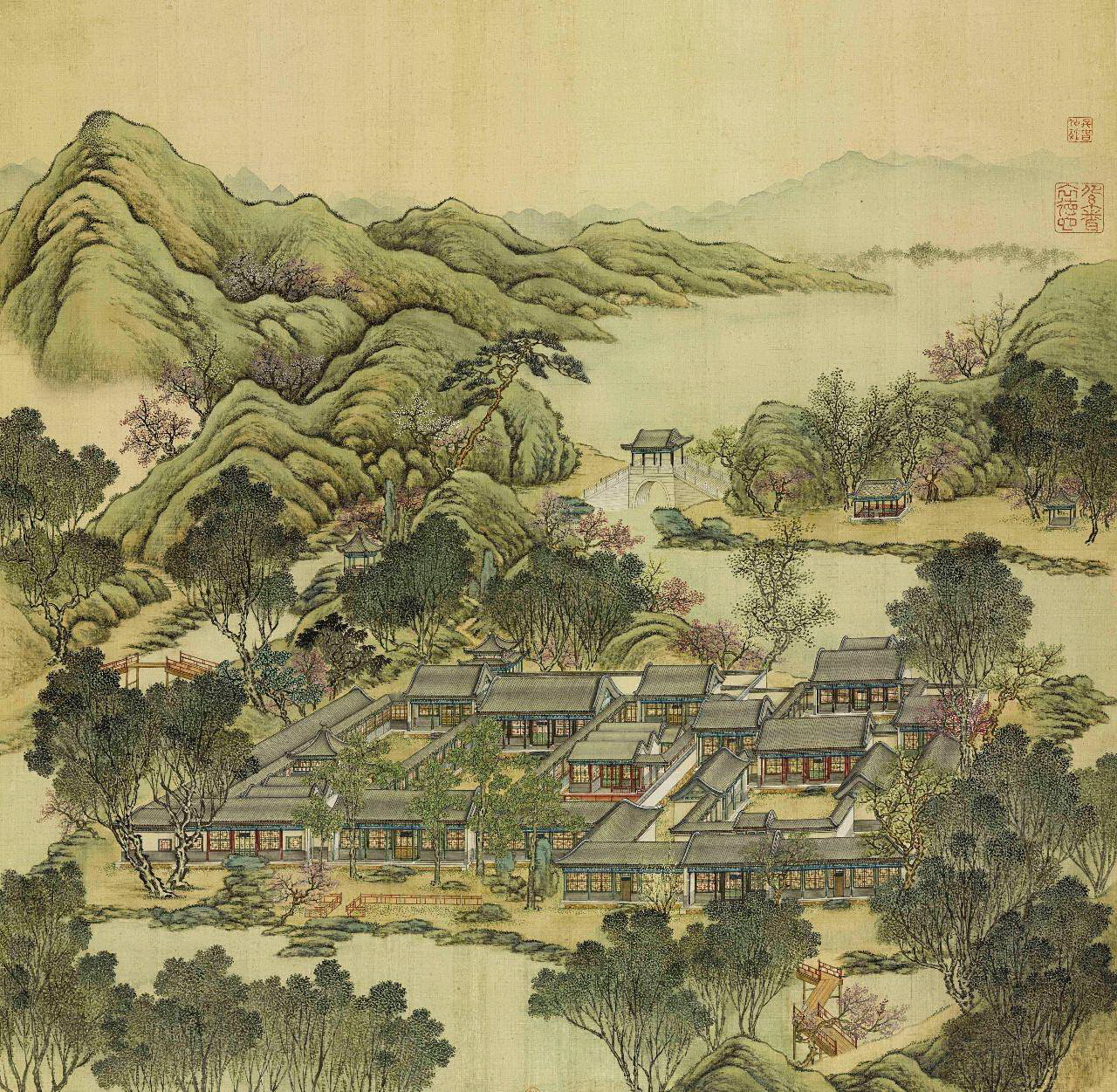
Eternal Spring Immortals Hall
Chinese: 長春仙館; pinyin: Chángchūn xianguǎn

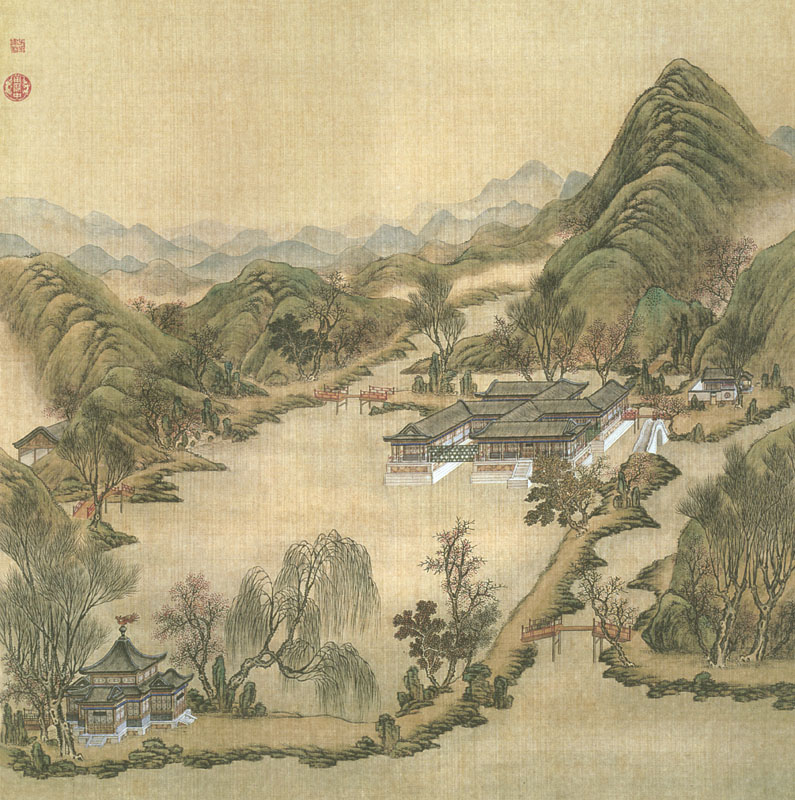
Peace and Harmony Everywhere (Swastika House)
Chinese: 萬方安和; pinyin: Wànfāng ānhé

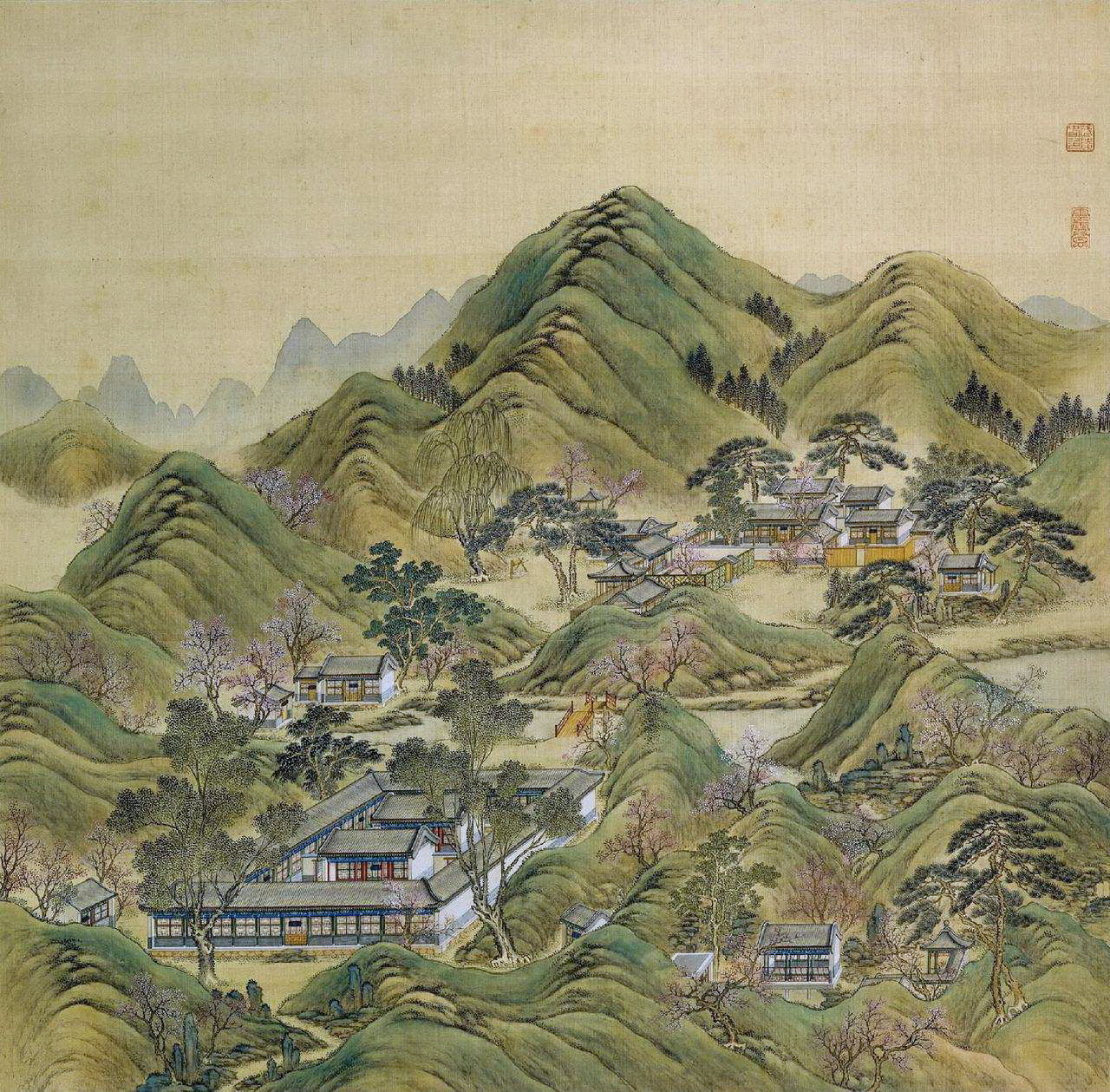
Spring Color at Wuling
Chinese: 武陵春色; pinyin: Wǔlíng chūnsè

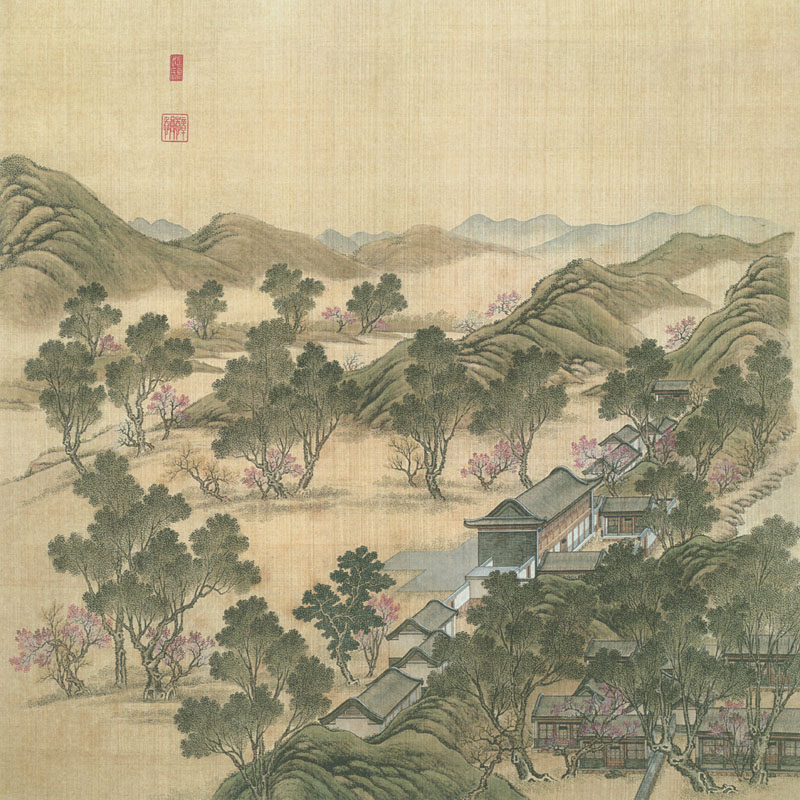
Hills High and Waters Long (The Drill Field)
Chinese: 山高水長; pinyin: Shāngāo shuǐcháng

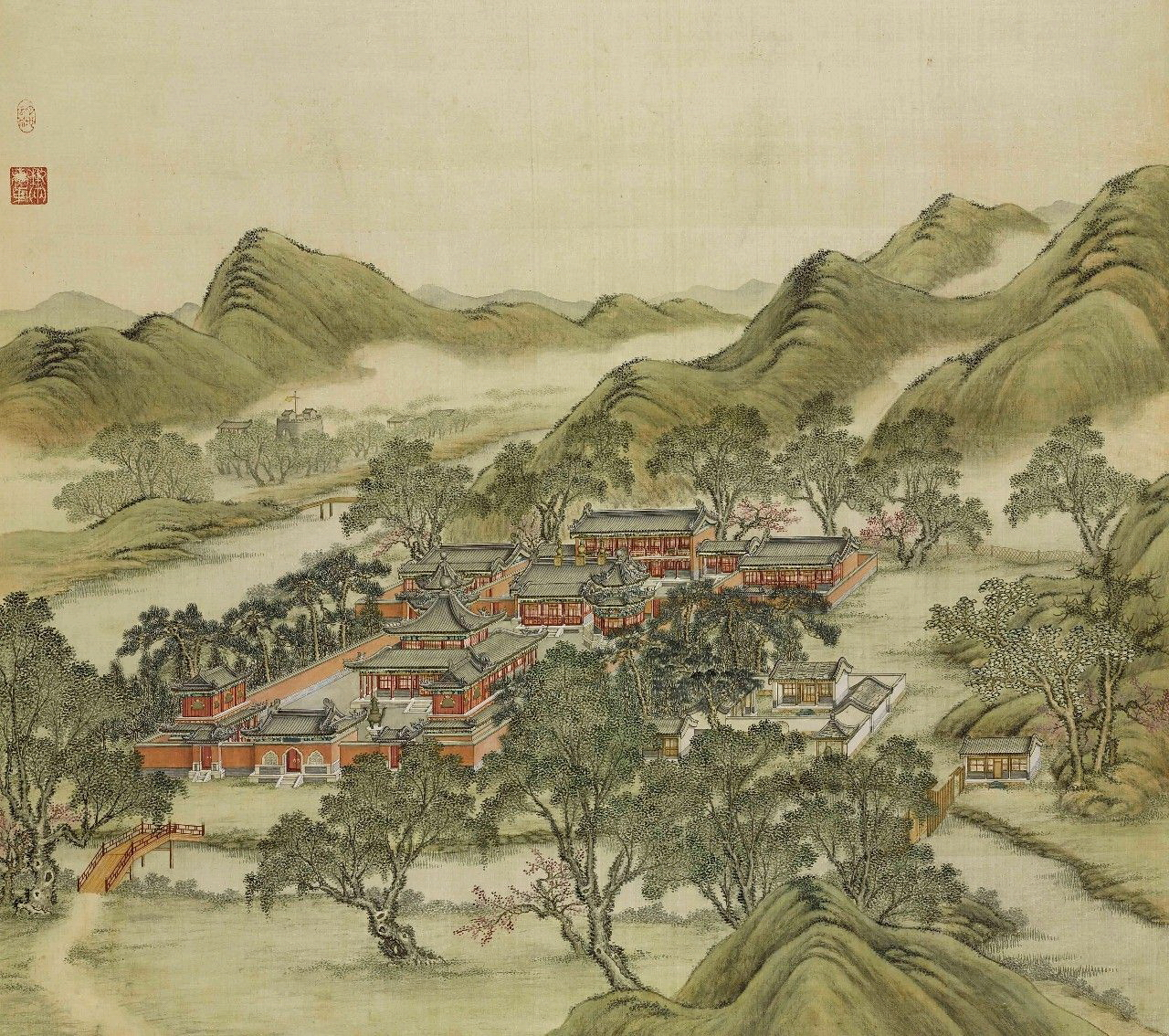
Dwelling of the Moon, Earth, and Clouds
Chinese: 月地雲居; pinyin: Yuèdi yúnjū

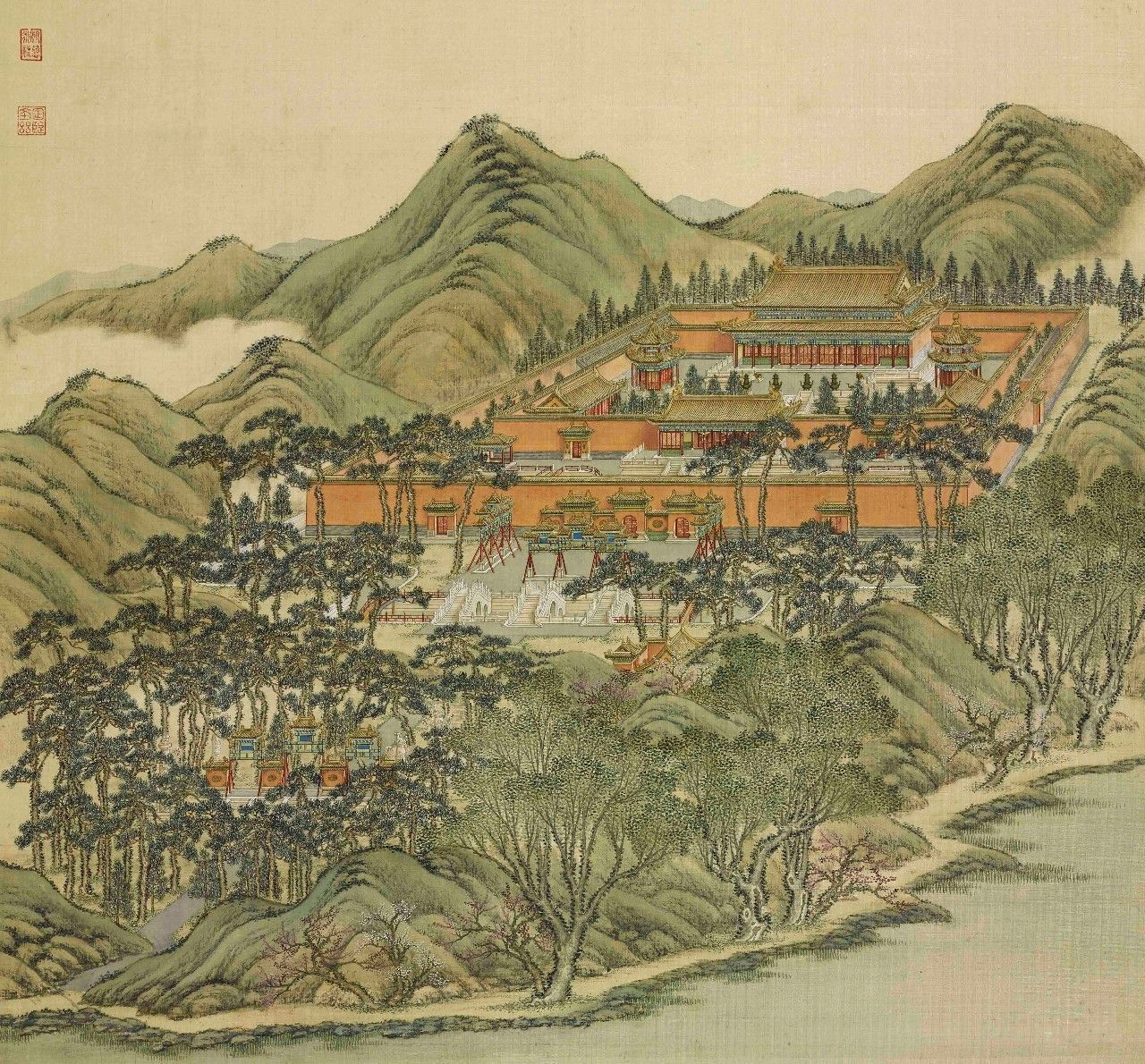
Vast Compassion and Eternal Blessing (Ancestral Shrine)
Chinese: 鴻慈永祜; pinyin: Hóngcí yǒnghù

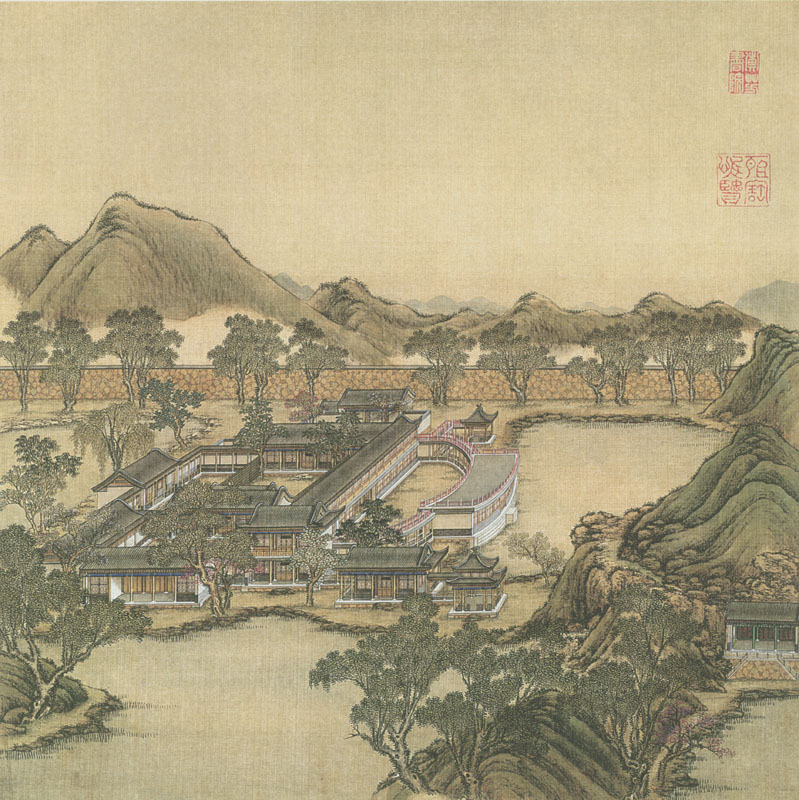
Library of Collected Fragrances
Chinese: 彙芳書院; pinyin: Huìfāng shūyuàn

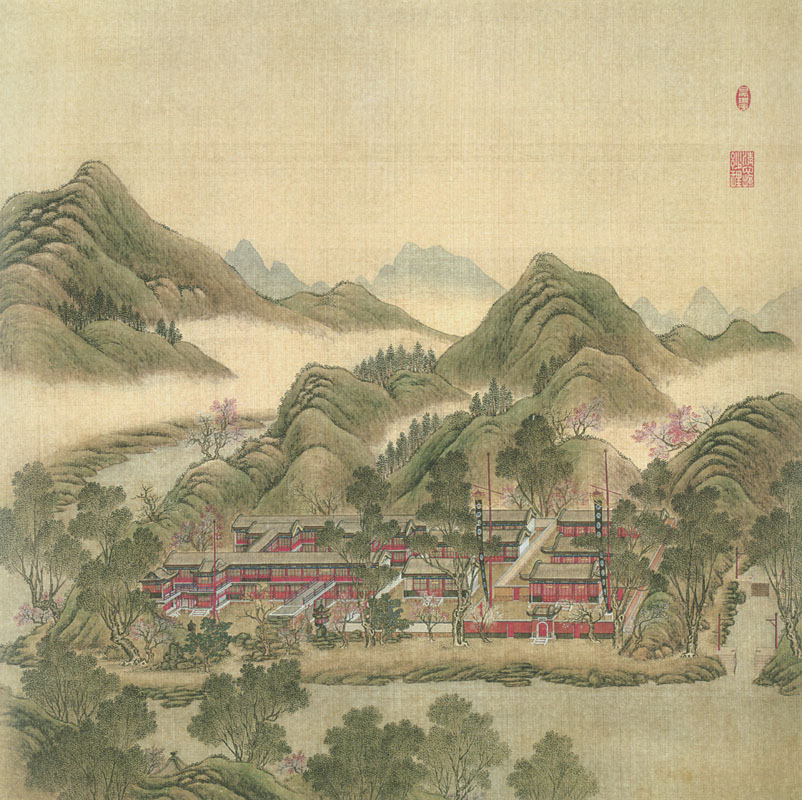
Dazzling Eaves Under Heaven (Buddhist compound)
Chinese: 日天琳宇; pinyin: Rìtiān línyǔ

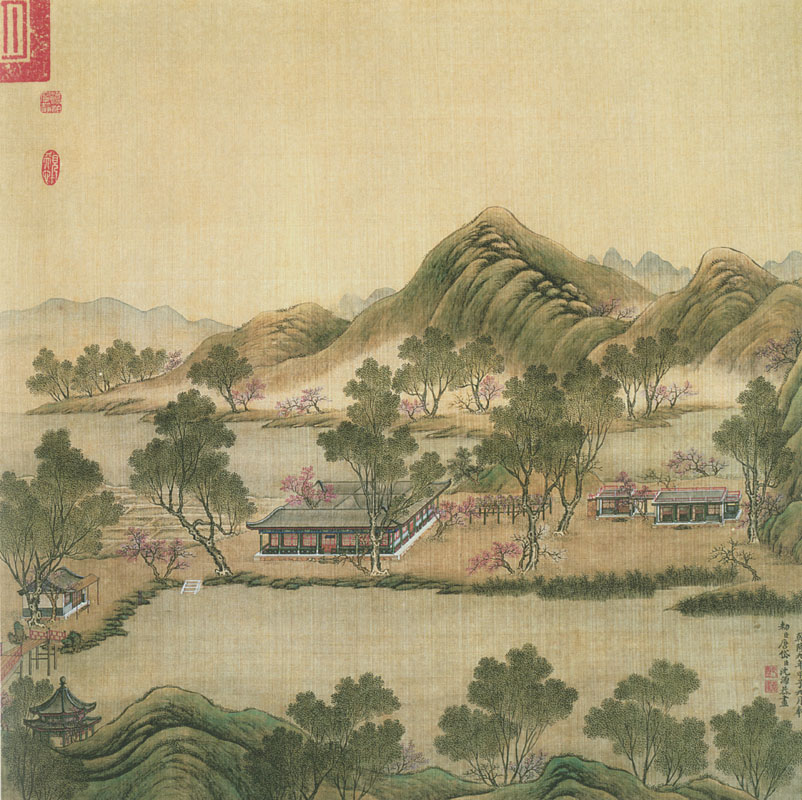
Simple Life in Quietude (The “Field” Character Building)
Chinese: 澹泊寧靜; pinyin: Dànbó níngjìng

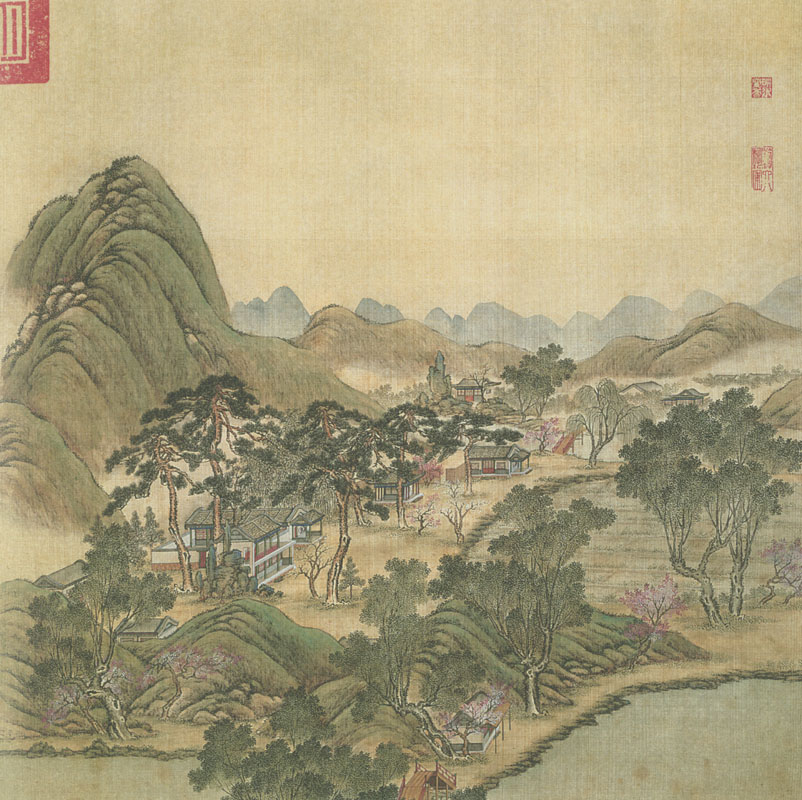
Reflections on Water and Fragrance of Iris
Chinese: 映水蘭香; pinyin: Yìngshuǐ lánxiāng

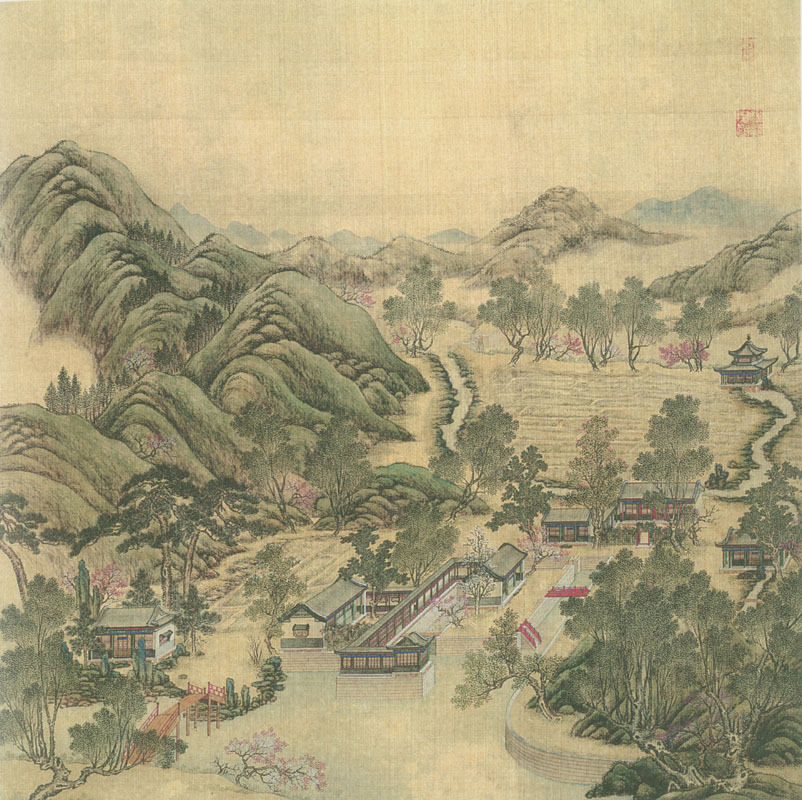
Sounds of Trees and Water
Chinese: 水木明瑟; pinyin: Shuǐmù míngsè

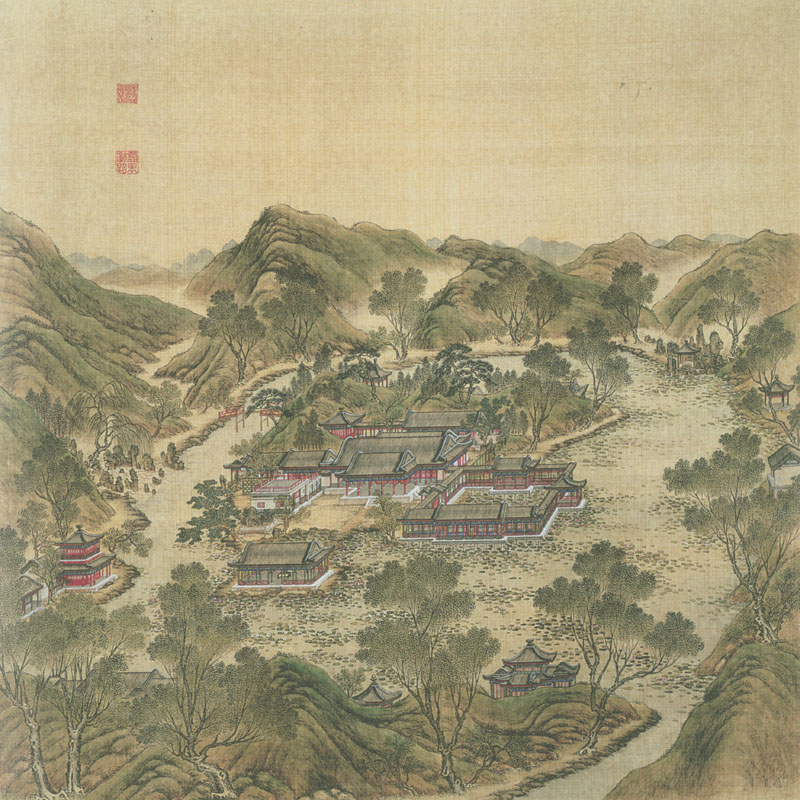
Happy Place of Lianxi
Chinese: 濂溪樂處; pinyin: Liánxī lèchù

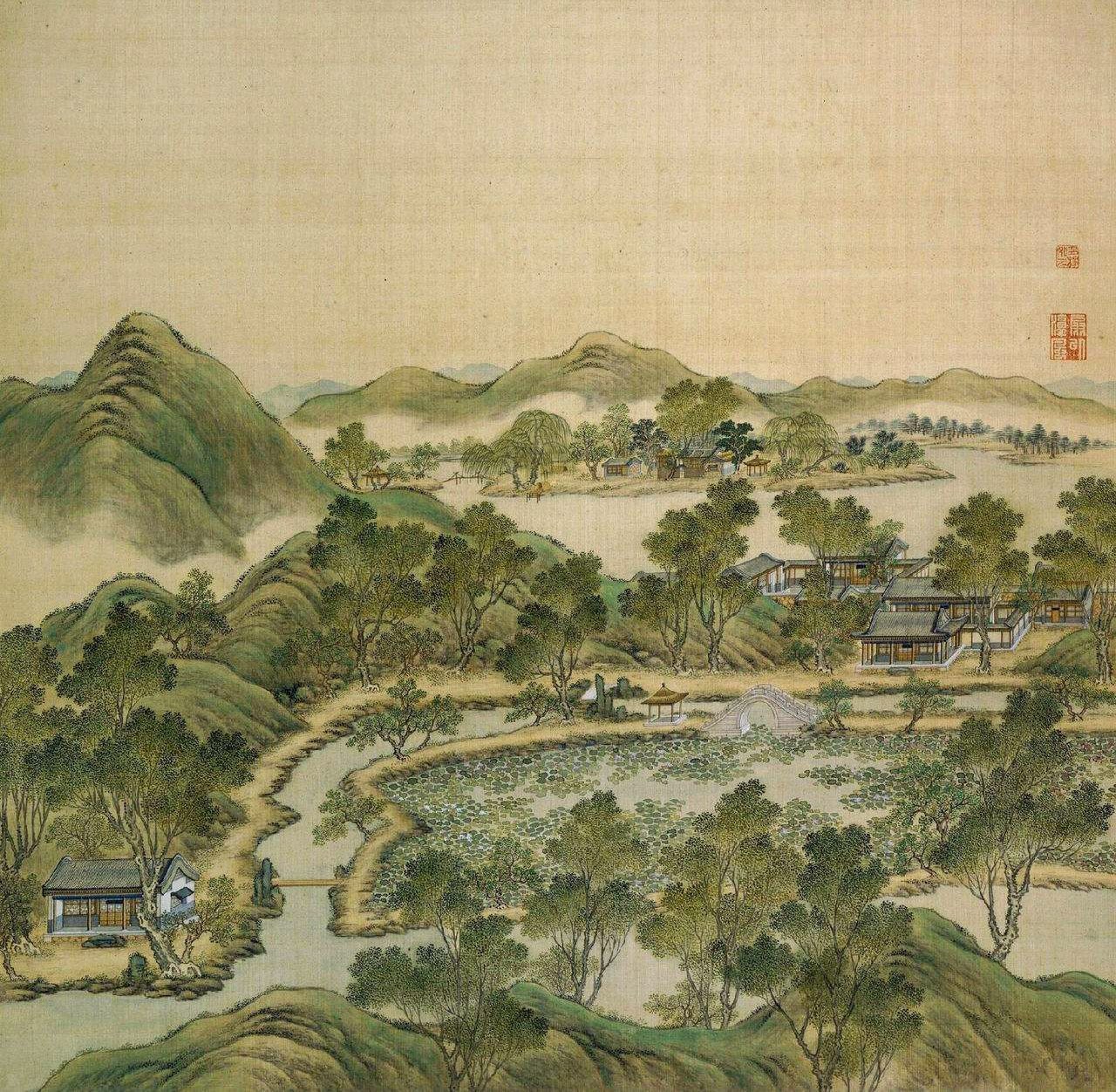
Crops as Beautiful as the Clouds
Chinese: 多稼如雲; pinyin: Duōjia rúyún

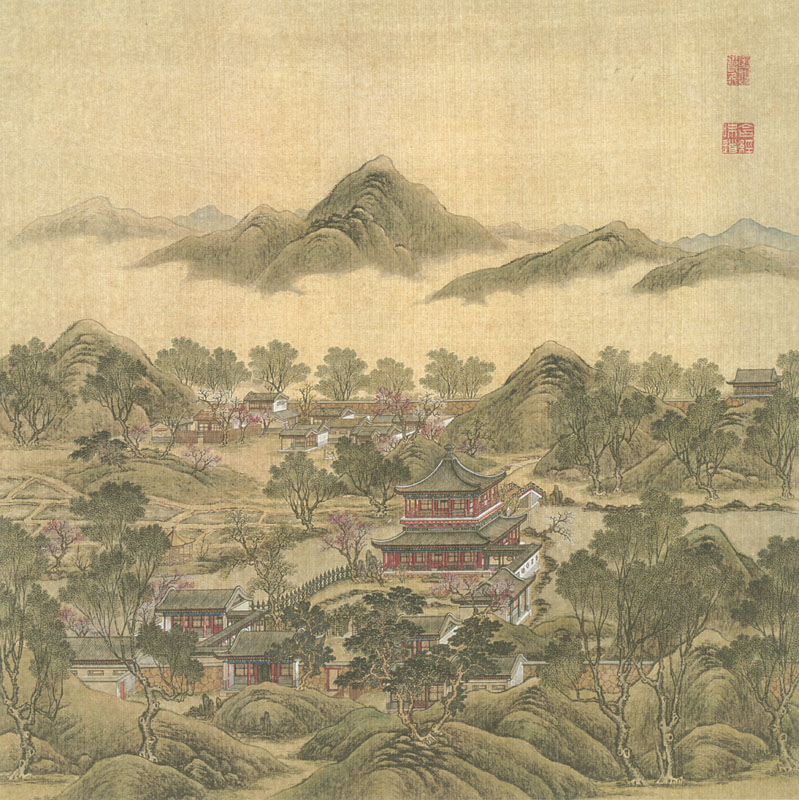
Fish Leap and Birds Fly
Chinese: 魚躍鳶飛; pinyin: Yúyuè yuānfēi

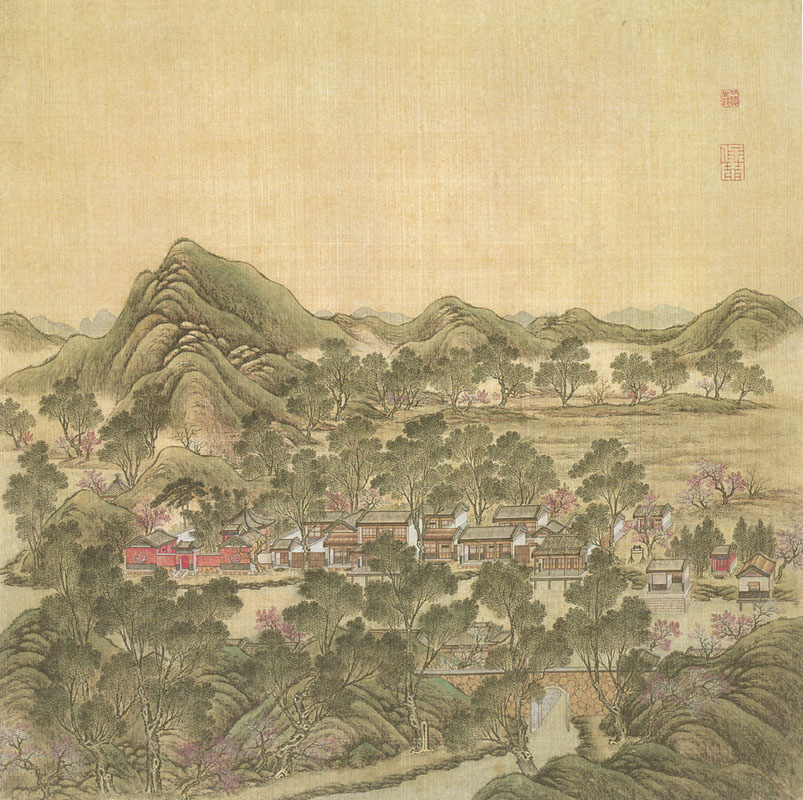
Village of Distant Northern Mountains
Chinese: 北遠山村; pinyin: Běi yuǎn shān cūn

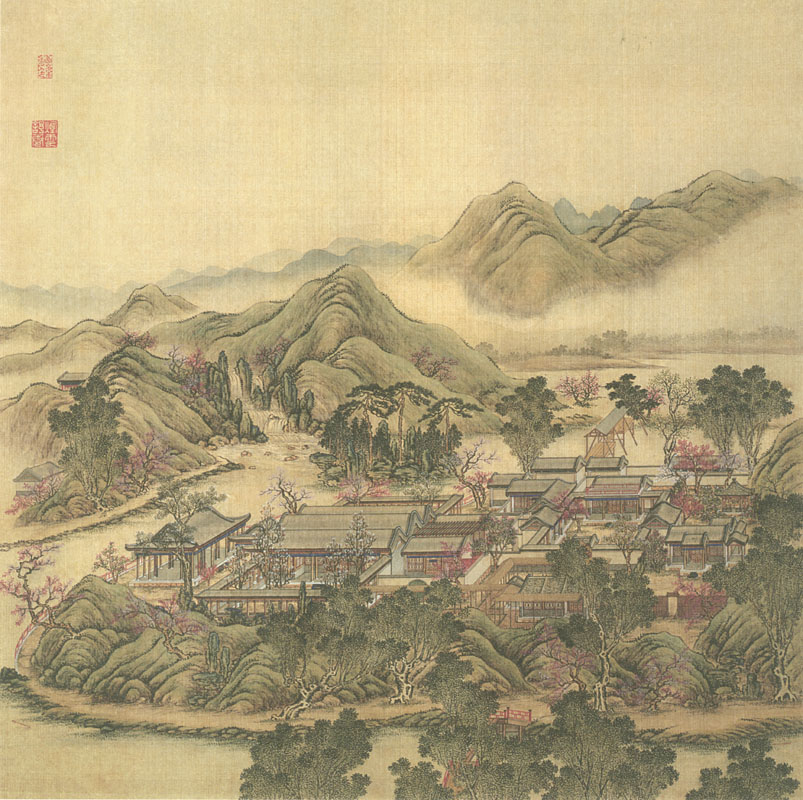
Elegant Color of the Western Peaks
Chinese: 西峰秀色; pinyin: Xifēng xiùsè

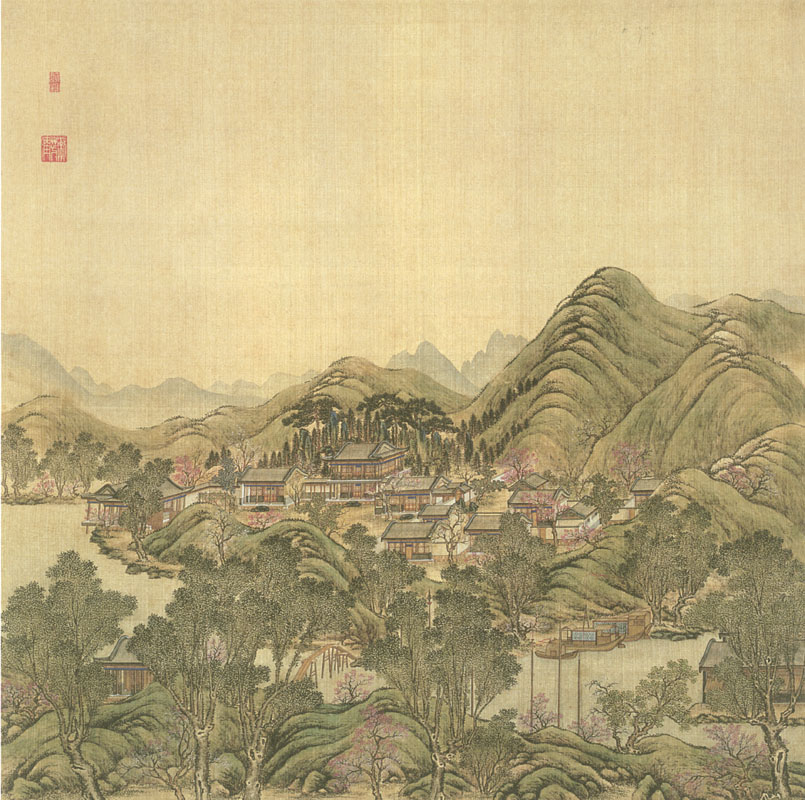
Library of the Four Seasons
Chinese: 四宜書屋; pinyin: Sìyi shūwū

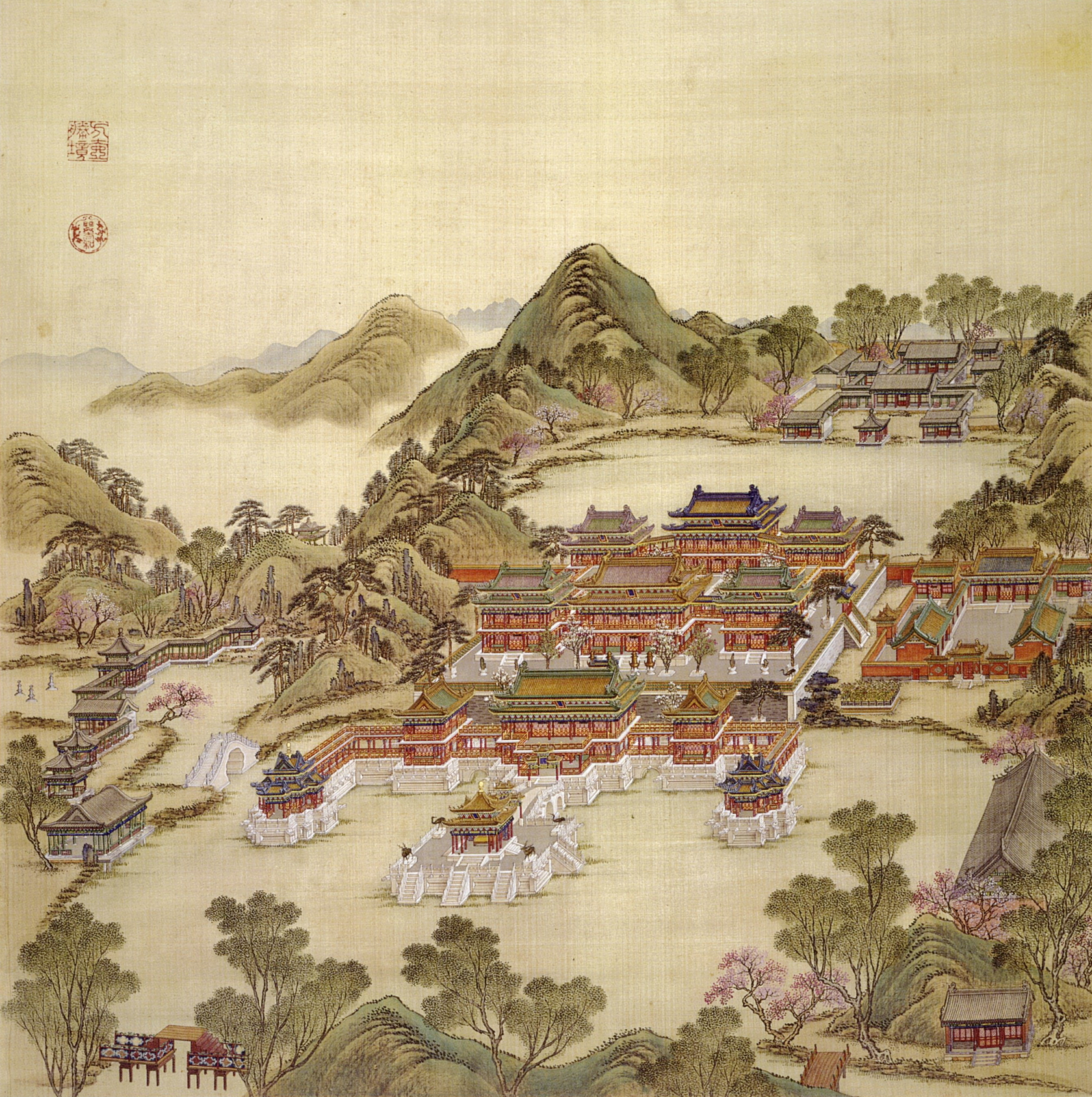
Beautiful Scene of the Square Pot
Chinese: 方壺勝景; pinyin: Fānghú shèngjǐng

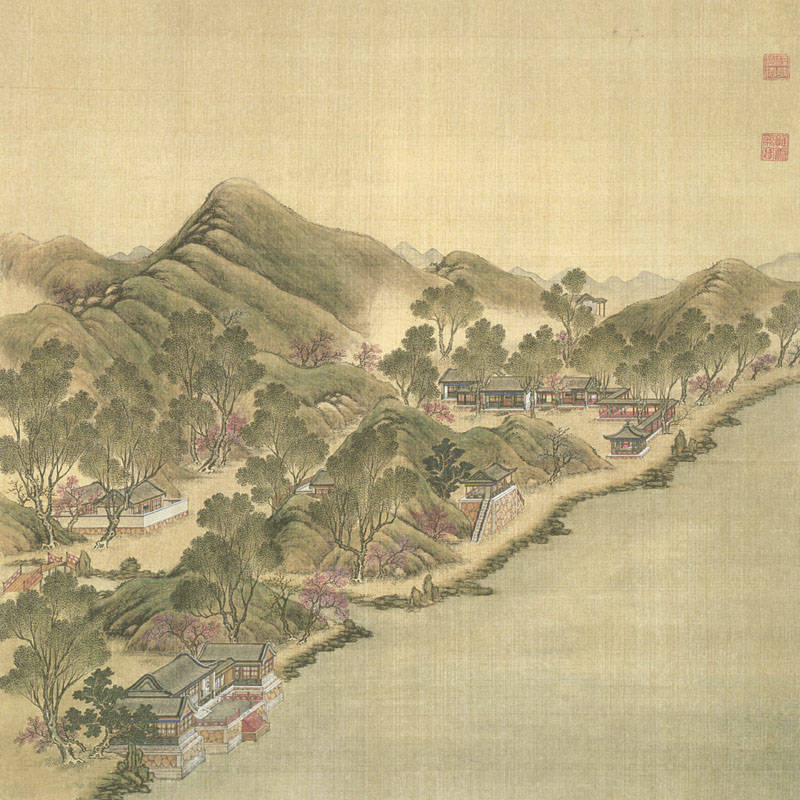
Bath in Virtue
Chinese: 澡身浴德; pinyin: Zǎoshēn yùdé

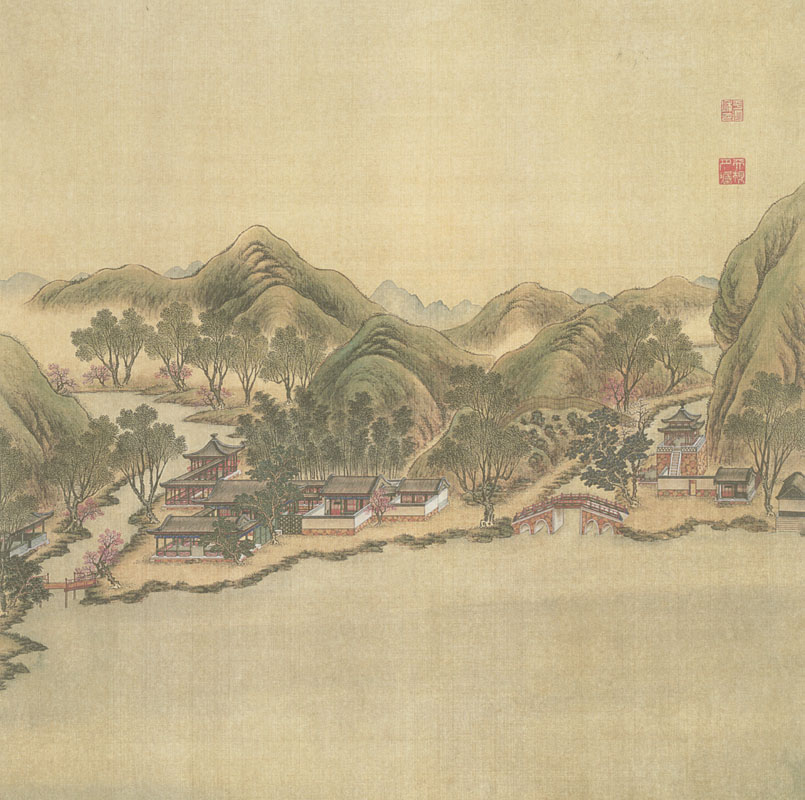
Calm Lake Under the Autumn Moon
Chinese: 平湖秋月; pinyin: Pínghú qiūyuè

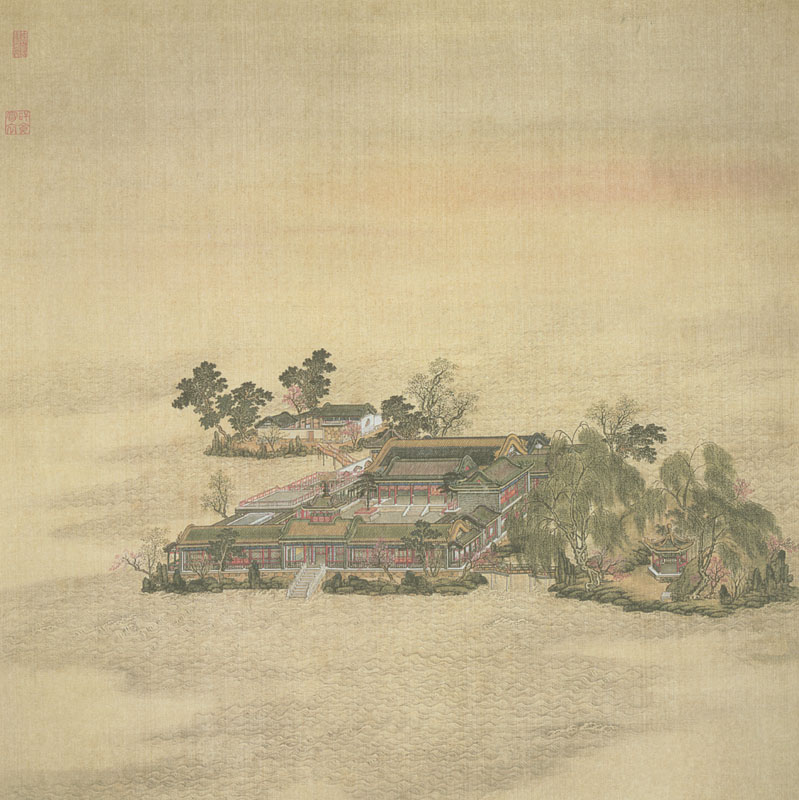
Jade Terrace of Paradise Island
Chinese: 蓬島瑤臺; pinyin: Péngdǎo yáotái

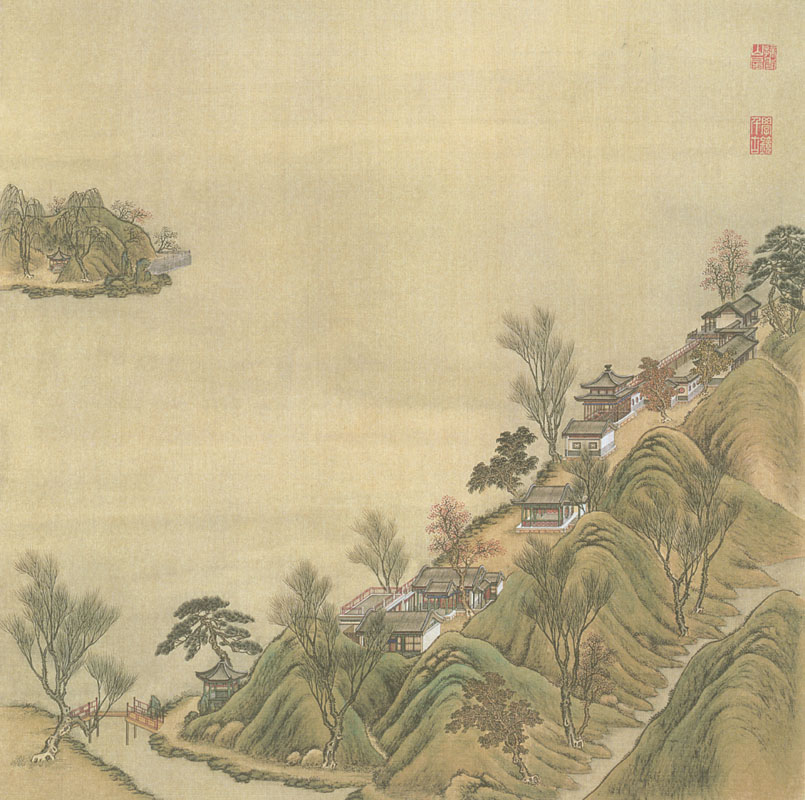
House Which Meets the Beauty of the Hills
Chinese: 接秀山房; pinyin: Jiēxiù shānfáng

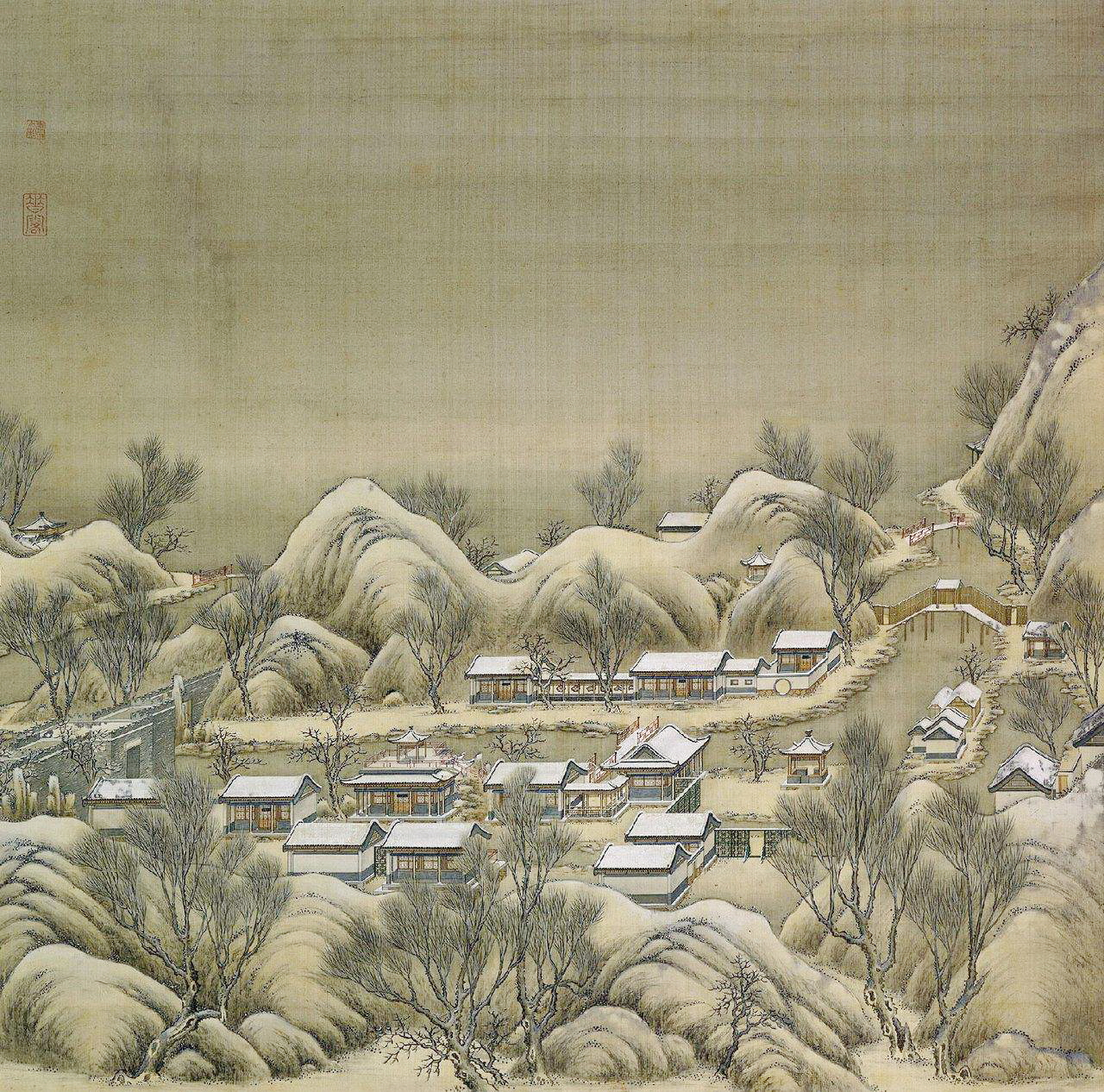
There Is Another Cave Of Heaven
Chinese: 別有洞天; pinyin: Bié yǒu dòngtiān

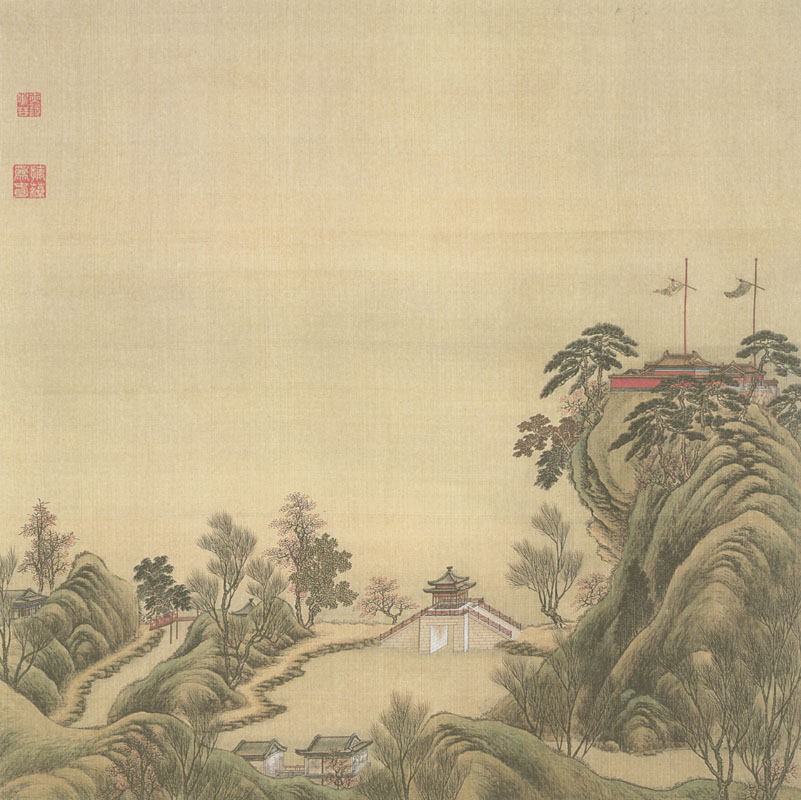
Double Reflection and Sound of the Lute
Chinese: 夾鏡鳴琴; pinyin: Jiājìng míngqín

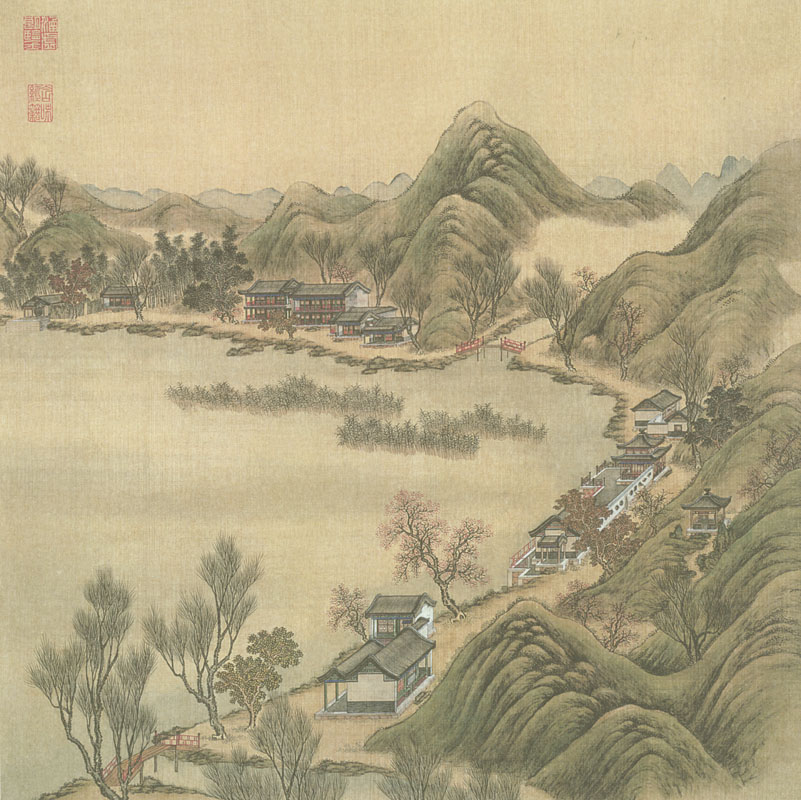
Vast Empty Clear Mirror
Chinese: 涵虛朗鑒; pinyin: Hánxū lǎngjiàn

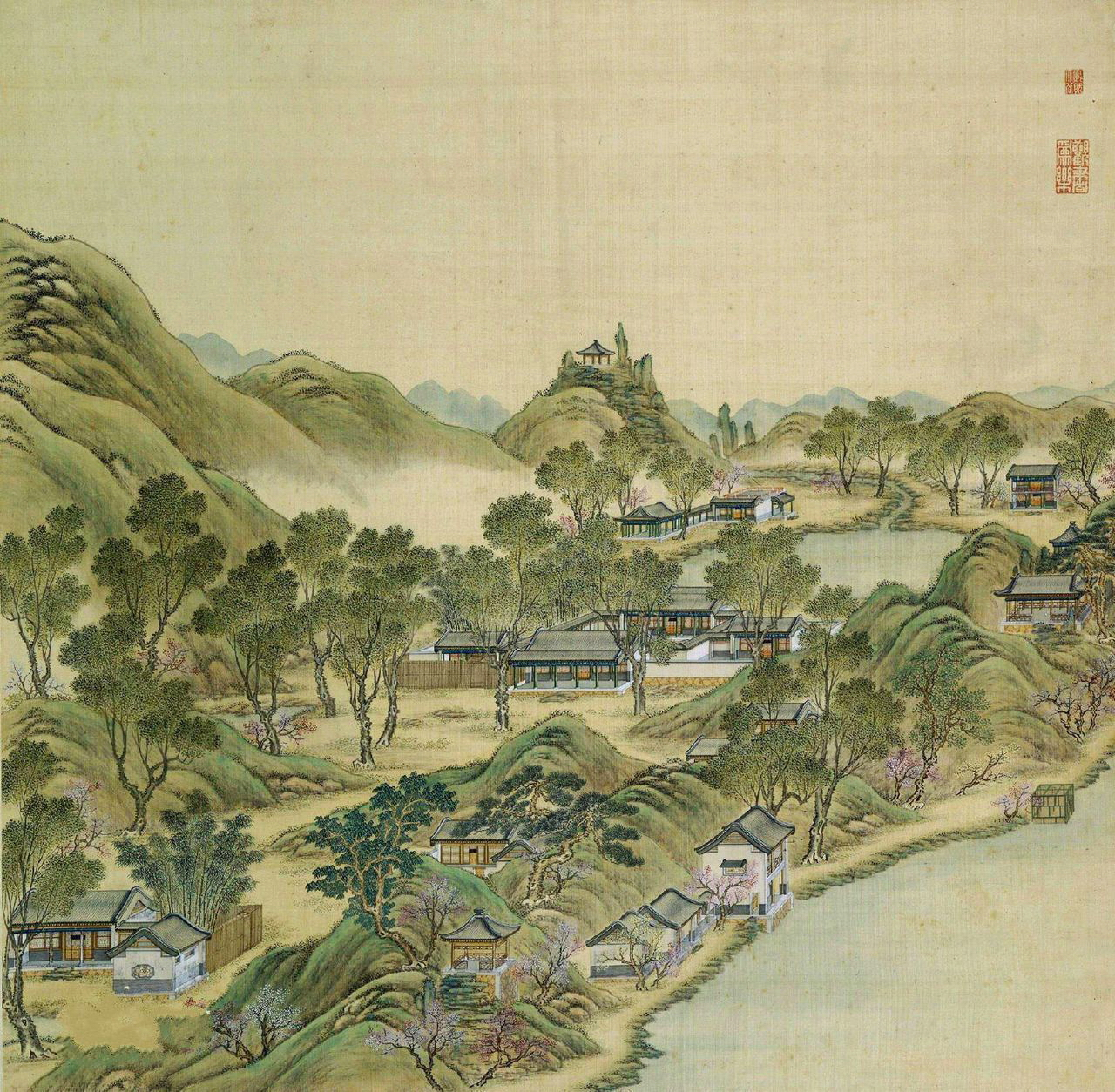
Boundless Impartiality
Chinese: 廓然大公; pinyin: Kuòrán dàgōng

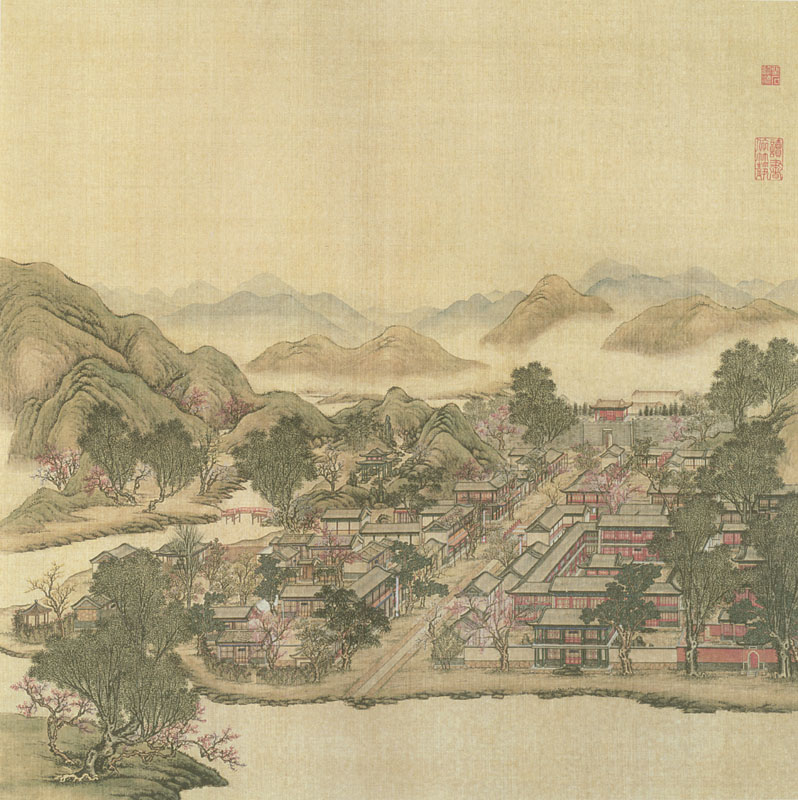
Sitting Rocks and Winding Stream
Chinese: 坐石臨流; pinyin: Zuòshí línliú

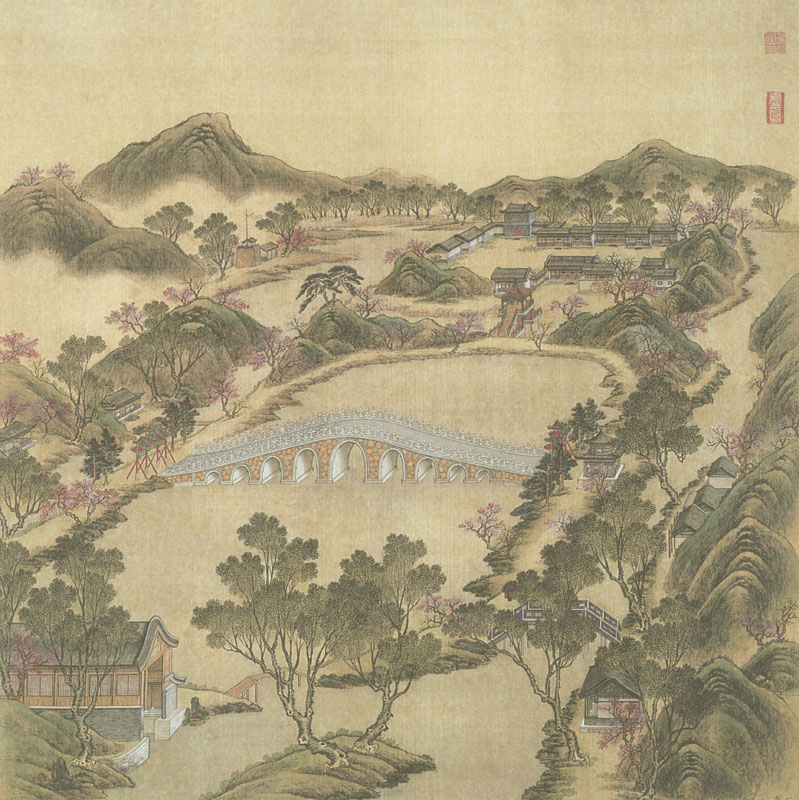
Distillery and Lotus Pond
Chinese: 麴院風荷; pinyin: Qūyuàn fēnghé

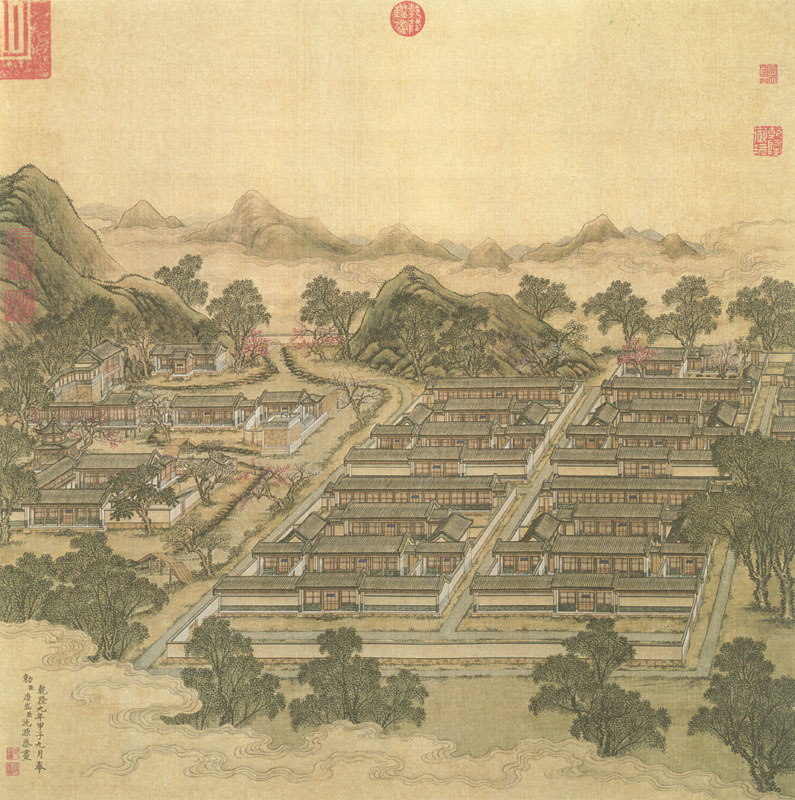
Deep Vault of Heaven (The Princes’ School)
Chinese: 洞天深處; pinyin: Dòngtiān shēnchù
