= Old Summer Palace bronze heads =

Bronze heads associated with Chinese zodiac

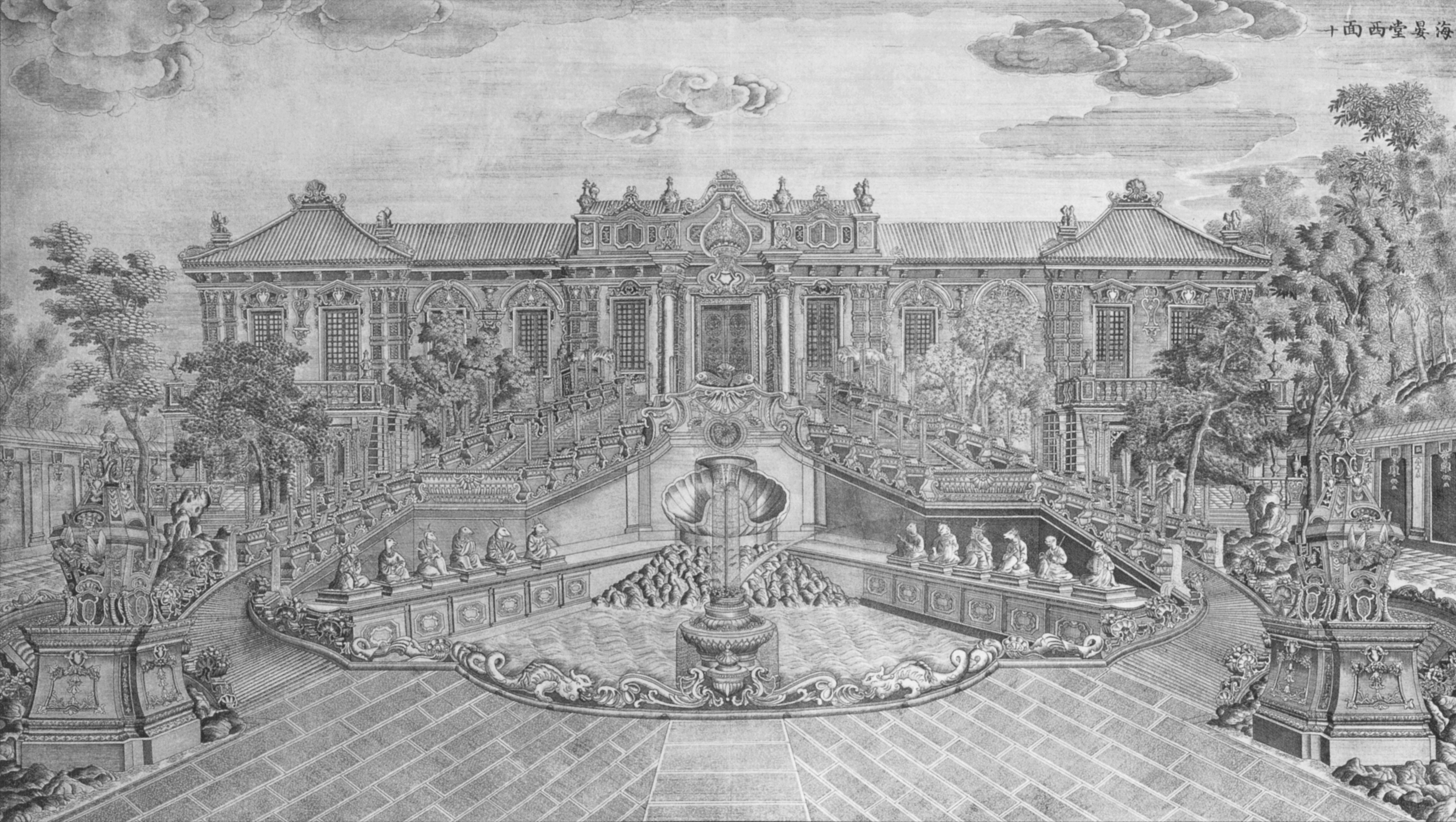
The original figures in a drawing before the looting with all 12 head figures

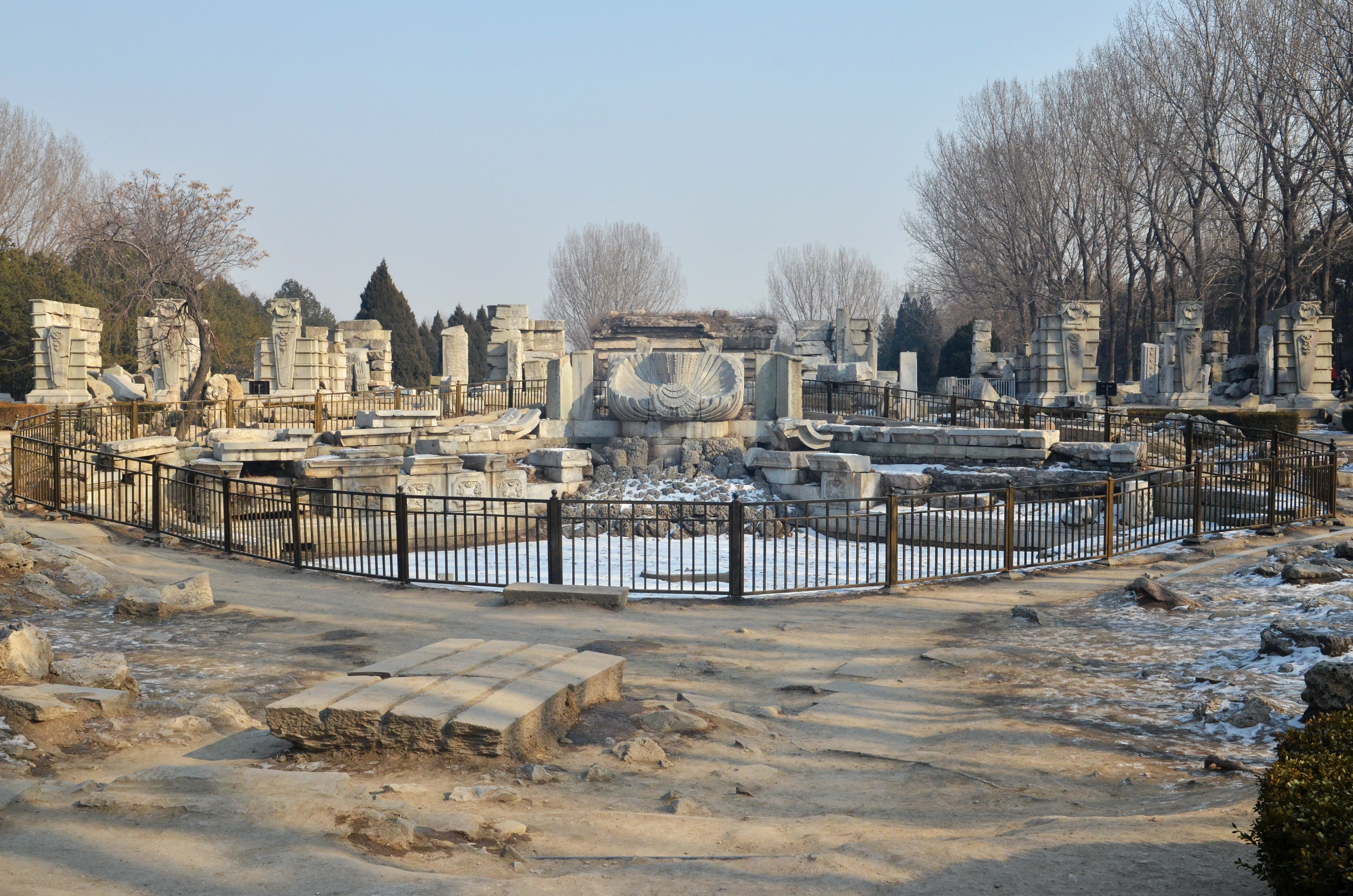
The site of the water fountain in 2013

The Twelve Old Summer Palace bronze heads are a collection of bronze fountainheads in the shape of the Chinese zodiac animals that were part of a water clock fountain in front of the Haiyantang (Chinese: 海晏堂; pinyin: Hǎiyàntáng) building of the Xiyang Lou (Western style mansions) area of the Old Summer Palace in Beijing. Believed to have been designed by the Jesuit Giuseppe Castiglione with fountains engineered by Jesuit Michel Benoist for the Qianlong Emperor, the statues would spout out water from their mouths to tell the time.

The bronze-cast heads of the stone statues were among the treasures looted during the destruction of the Old Summer Palace by British and French expeditionary forces in 1860 during the Second Opium War. Since then, they have been among the most visible examples of attempts to repatriate Chinese art and cultural artifacts. Two of the heads, the rat and the rabbit, were formerly held by French fashion designer Yves Saint Laurent and were the subject of an international scandal (2009 auction of Old Summer Palace bronze heads).

The Poly Museum (New Beijing Poly Plaza), a museum in Beijing owned and operated by China Poly Group Corporation, a state-owned Chinese business group enterprise, is filled with repatriated artworks, including several of the animal fountainheads. China Poly bought the tiger, monkey, and ox through auction houses in Hong Kong in 2000, while the pig's head was recovered in New York by Hong Kong casino magnate Stanley Ho, who in turn donated it to the Poly Museum.

The CEO of Poly Culture (an offshoot of China Poly Group focused on art-repatriation and antiquities), Jiang Yingchun, has been quoted as saying: "The heads represent our feelings for the entire nation; we love them and we weep for them. We can try many ways to get the heads back. The auction is just one method. We can't ignore that the art was taken illegally,” even if it was being well cared for, he said. “If you kidnapped my children and then treated them well, the crime is still not forgiven."

== Current status ==
| Photo | Animal | Year recovered | Current location | Cost | Notes |
|---|---|---|---|---|---|
| | Rat | 2013 | National Museum of China | $18 million at hammer price | Yves Saint Laurent's collection. Christie's, 2009. Donated by François Pinault (Christie's owner) in a ceremony on 28 June 2013 |
| | Ox | 2000 | Poly Art Museum, Beijing | US$0.98 million | Sotheby's London, June 1989. By Christie's Hong Kong, 2000. From China Poly Group Corp. |
| | Tiger | 2000 | Poly Art Museum, Beijing | US$1.98 million | Sotheby's London, June 1989. By Sotheby's Hong Kong, 2000. From China Poly Group Corp. |
| (4th from left) | Rabbit | 2013 | National Museum of China | $18 million at hammer price | Yves Saint Laurent's collection. Christie's, 2009 Donated by François Pinault in a ceremony on 28 June 2013 |
| | Dragon | 2018 | unknown | - | Possibly sold on 17 December 2018, at auction house Tessier & Sarrou et Associés for $3.4 million to a Chinese national but not verified as authentic |
| | Snake | - | unknown | - | - |
| | Horse | 2007 | Old Summer Palace | US$8.84 million | Sotheby's London, June 1989, US$400,000. Stanley Ho bought it in a Sotheby's Hong Kong auction in 2007. It was displayed for a while at the Grand Lisboa in Macau. Stanley Ho donated it to the National Cultural Heritage Administration in 2019. After a stint in the Capital Museum, the NCHA moved the horse head back to the Old Summer Palace. |
| | Goat | - | unknown | - | - |
| | Monkey | 2000 | Poly Art Museum, Beijing | US$1.03 million | New York, 1987. By Christie's Hong Kong, 2000 From China Poly Group Corp. |
| (3rd from right) | Rooster | - | unknown | - | - |
| | Dog | - | unknown | - | In 2003, a Hong Kong auction house planned to sell a fake. |
| | Pig | 2003 | Poly Art Museum, Beijing | US$0.77 million | New York, 1987. From Stanley Ho |

== In culture ==
- Ai Weiwei in 2010 created his own interpretation of 12 heads called "Circle of Animals/Zodiac Heads", where 5 were recreated. It exists in bronze and gold versions. Sold for $4.4 million.
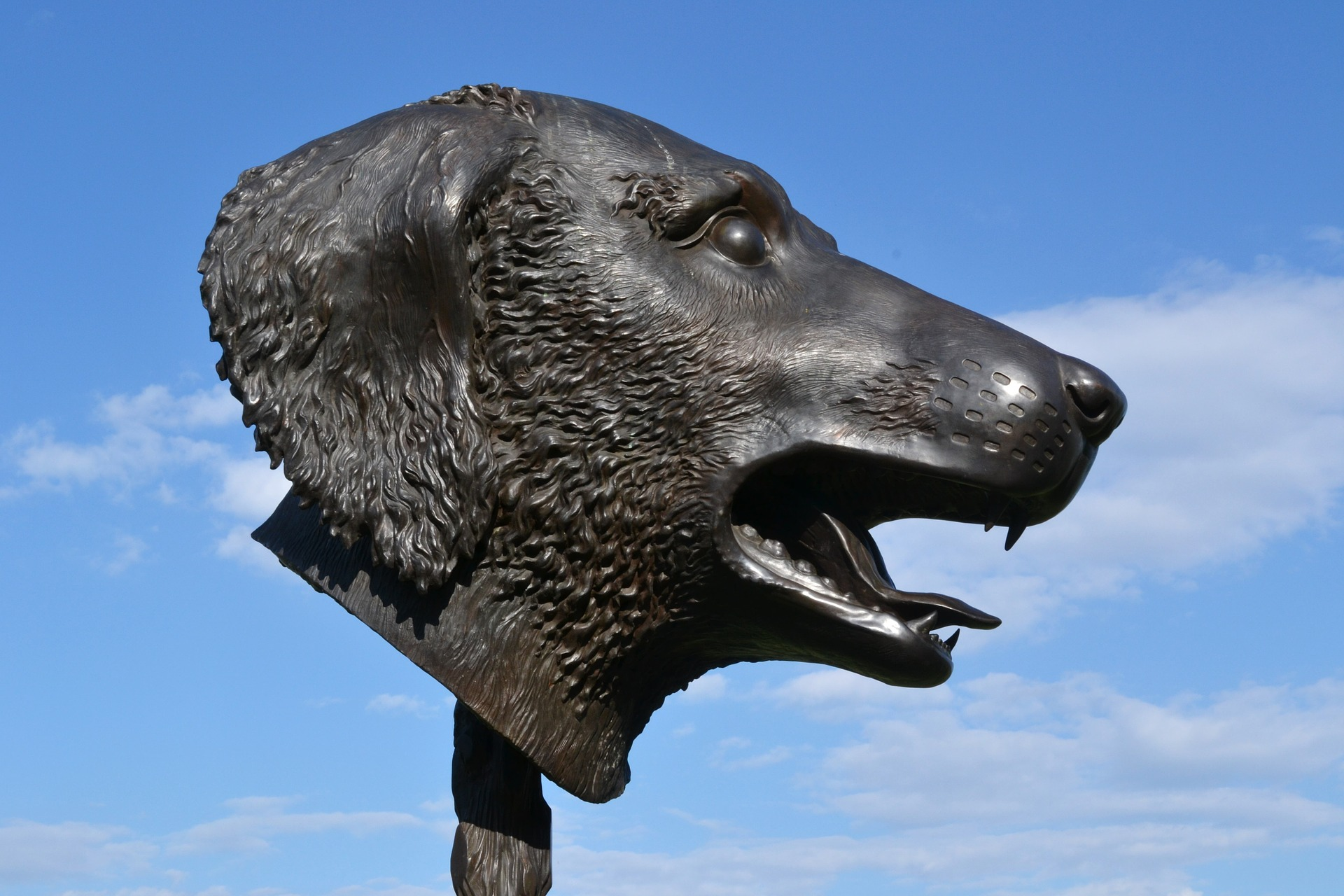

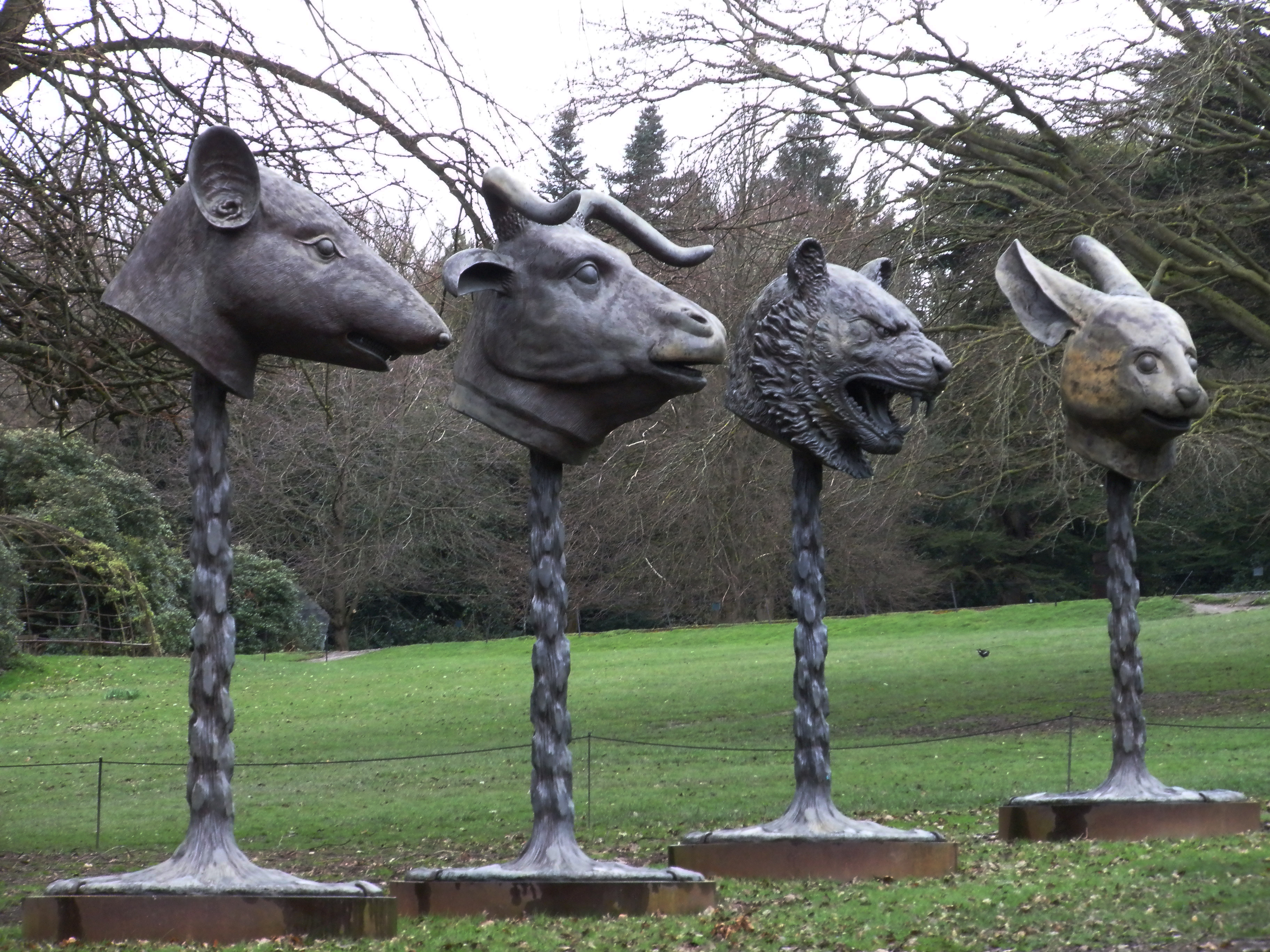
Circle of Animals Zodiac heads
- CZ12 (2012) - Jackie Chan's movie about treasure hunting.
- Portrait of a Thief (2022), novel by Grace D. Li

== See also ==
- 2009 auction of Old Summer Palace bronze heads
- State Administration of Cultural Heritage
