= 2009 auction of Old Summer Palace bronze heads =

Auction of 18th-century fountainheads

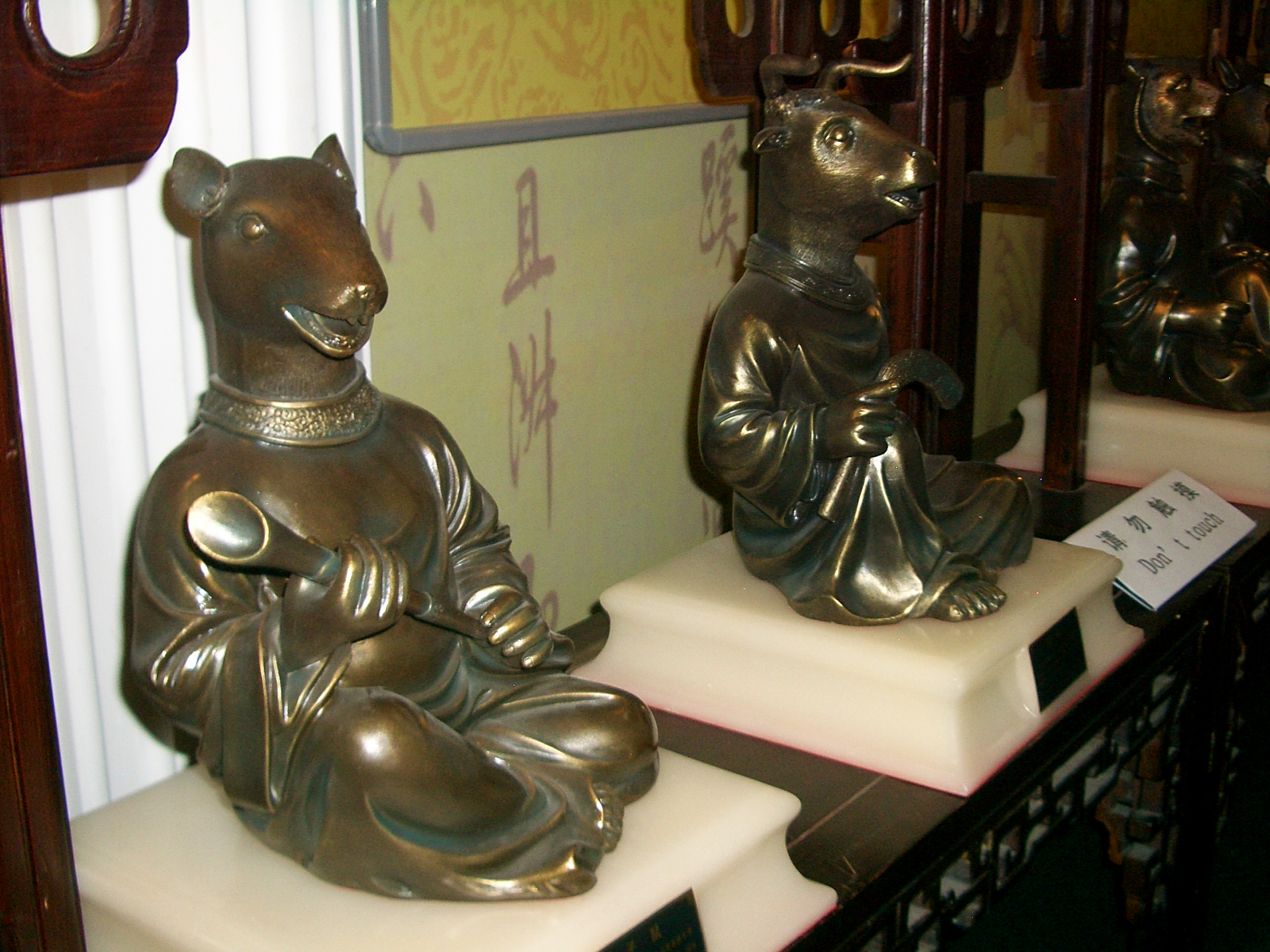
Replica of the original bronze Rat figure, as it existed before the destruction of the Old Summer Palace, on display at the palace grounds

In February 2009, two bronze head sculptures looted from the Old Summer Palace during the Second Opium War in 1860 were auctioned by international auction house Christie's in Paris. On 25 February 2009, the disputed 18th-century fountainheads — heads of a Rat and a Rabbit of the Chinese zodiac — were sold to Cai Mingchao (蔡銘超) for 28 million euros as part of an auction of art works owned by the late French designer Yves Saint Laurent. Cai is an adviser to China's National Treasures Fund, which seeks to retrieve looted treasures by foreign invaders during the Qing dynasty. He then refused to pay the sum bid, claiming that he was bidding on moral and patriotic grounds.

== Auction ==
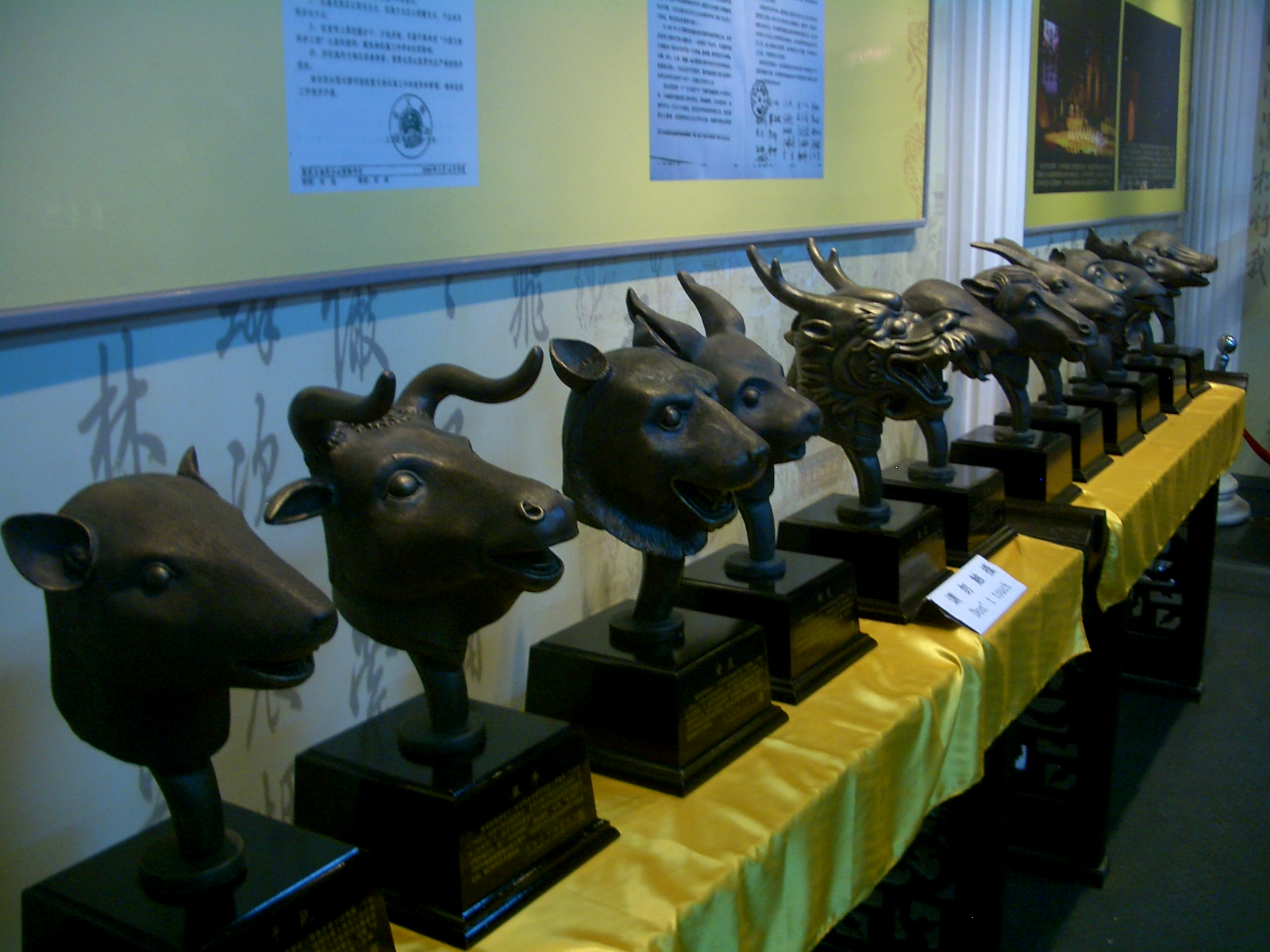
Replicas of the 12 heads

China's State Administration of Cultural Heritage had condemned the sale of the two bronzes and said it would affect Christie's interests in the country, ordering tighter inspections of all cultural relics that the auction house seeks to bring in or out of mainland China. It stated that the auction of the bronzes "goes against the spirit of relevant international conventions and the international common understanding that cultural relics should be returned to their country of origin."

A press conference was held in Beijing by Cai Mingchao, in which Mr. Cai told reporters that he would not be paying for the heads.

=== Reactions in France ===
The then-owner of the bronze relics, Pierre Berge told reporter over a French radio interview: "All they (Chinese) have to do is to declare they are going to apply human rights, give the Tibetans back their freedom and agree to accept the Dalai Lama on their territory, [...] If they do that, I would be very happy to go myself and bring these two Chinese heads to put them in the Summer Palace in Beijing." Ma Zhouxu, a Foreign Ministry spokesman ridiculed Mr. Bergé's remarks: "To infringe upon Chinese people’s cultural rights on the pretext of human rights is just ridiculous. In modern history, Western imperial powers have looted a lot of Chinese cultural relics. These cultural relics should all be returned."

=== Reactions in China ===
China's State Administration of Cultural Heritage has condemned the proceedings of the auction. On 27 February, the Chinese government issued tighter customs rules against Christie's in response to the auction. Among the Chinese public, news of the auction led to some netizens in China expressing anti-French sentiments towards the French people. Ren Xiaohong, a lawyer for the Association for the Protection of Chinese Art in Europe (APACE), filed a lawsuit against the auction taking place.

The government of the People's Republic of China has not made plans to purchase the artifacts, as doing so would acknowledge that the bronze heads were taken legally. Niu Xianfeng, deputy director of the Lost Cultural Relics Recovery Program said: "Though it hurts to pay for something that belongs to you, if we want to recover relics sometimes we have to buy them." Xie Chensheng, the doyen of Chinese cultural relics scholars, said "If your belongings are stolen and you see them in the market the next day you do not buy them back. You call the police." The bronze heads owned by the Chinese are on display at the Poly Art Museum in Beijing.

== Return to China ==
The Rat and Rabbit bronze heads were eventually returned to China, donated by François Pinault in a ceremony on June 28, 2013. The bronze heads are housed in the National Museum of China.

== See also ==
- Second Opium War and section Burning of the Summer Palaces
- James Bruce, 8th Earl of Elgin
- Haiyantang
- Looting
- CZ12 – a Jackie Chan film in which the statues are integral part of the plot
