= Xiyang Lou =

Ruins of 18th-century European-style imperial buildings, Beijing, China

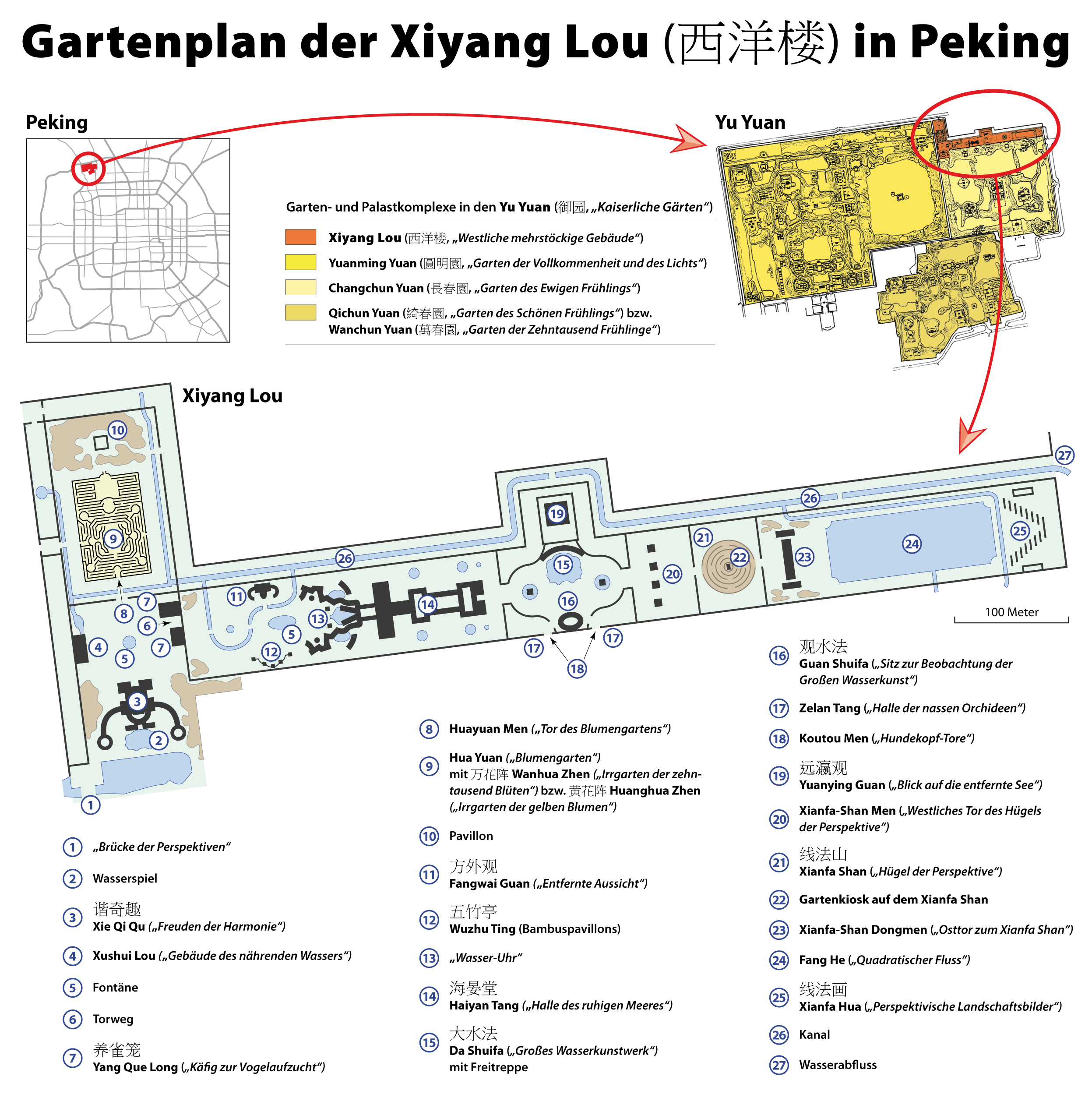
Map of the Xiyang Lou

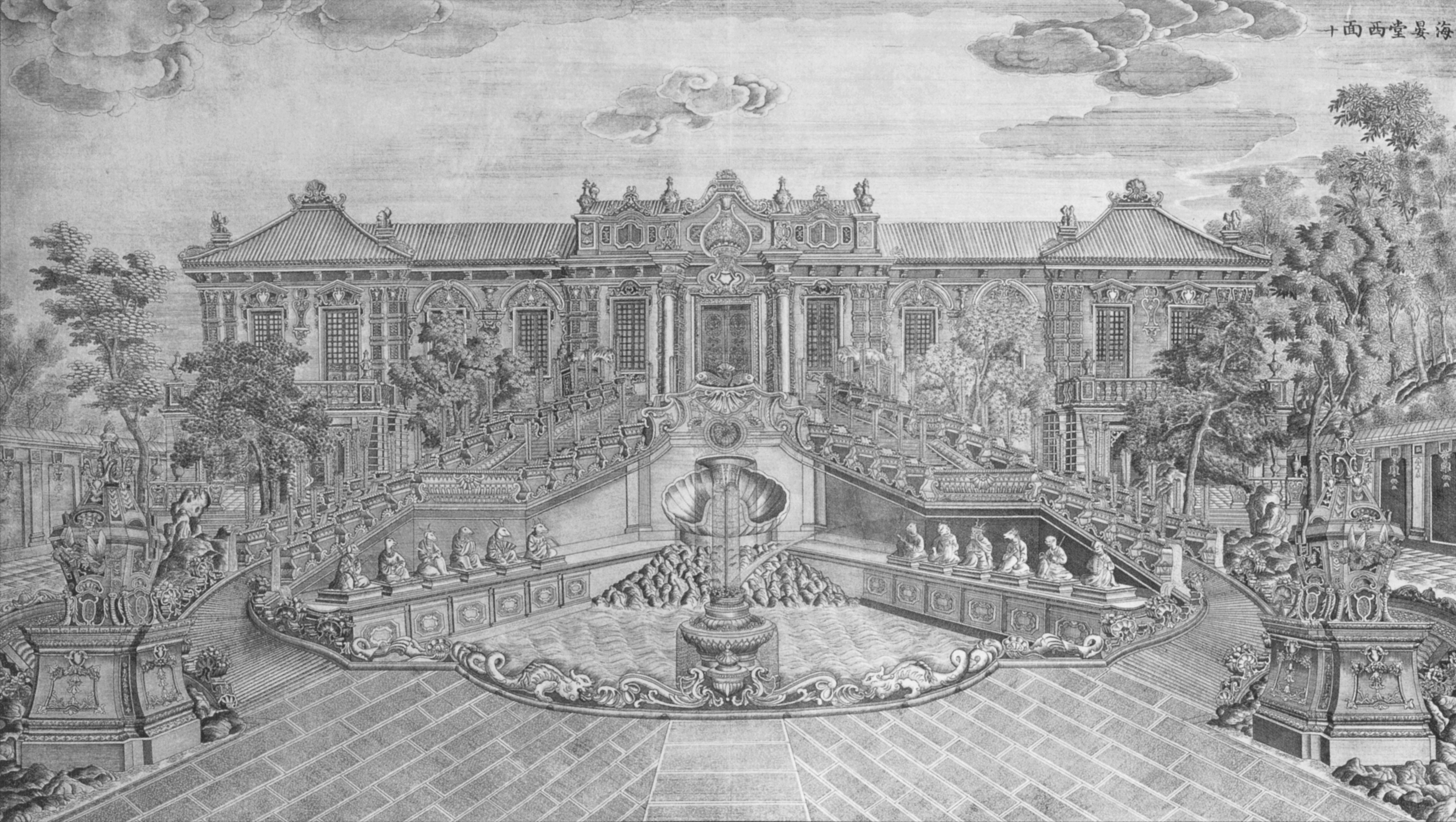
Haiyantang

Xiyang Lou (Chinese: 西洋楼; pinyin: Xīyáng Lóu; lit. 'Western mansion(s)'), are ruins of 18th-century European-style imperial buildings on the grounds of the Old Summer Palace in Beijing, China. They are located in the northern part of the Changchun Yuan (Garden of Eternal Spring), one of the three gardens which once made up the Old Summer Palace, and cover an area of about 7 hectares.

== History ==
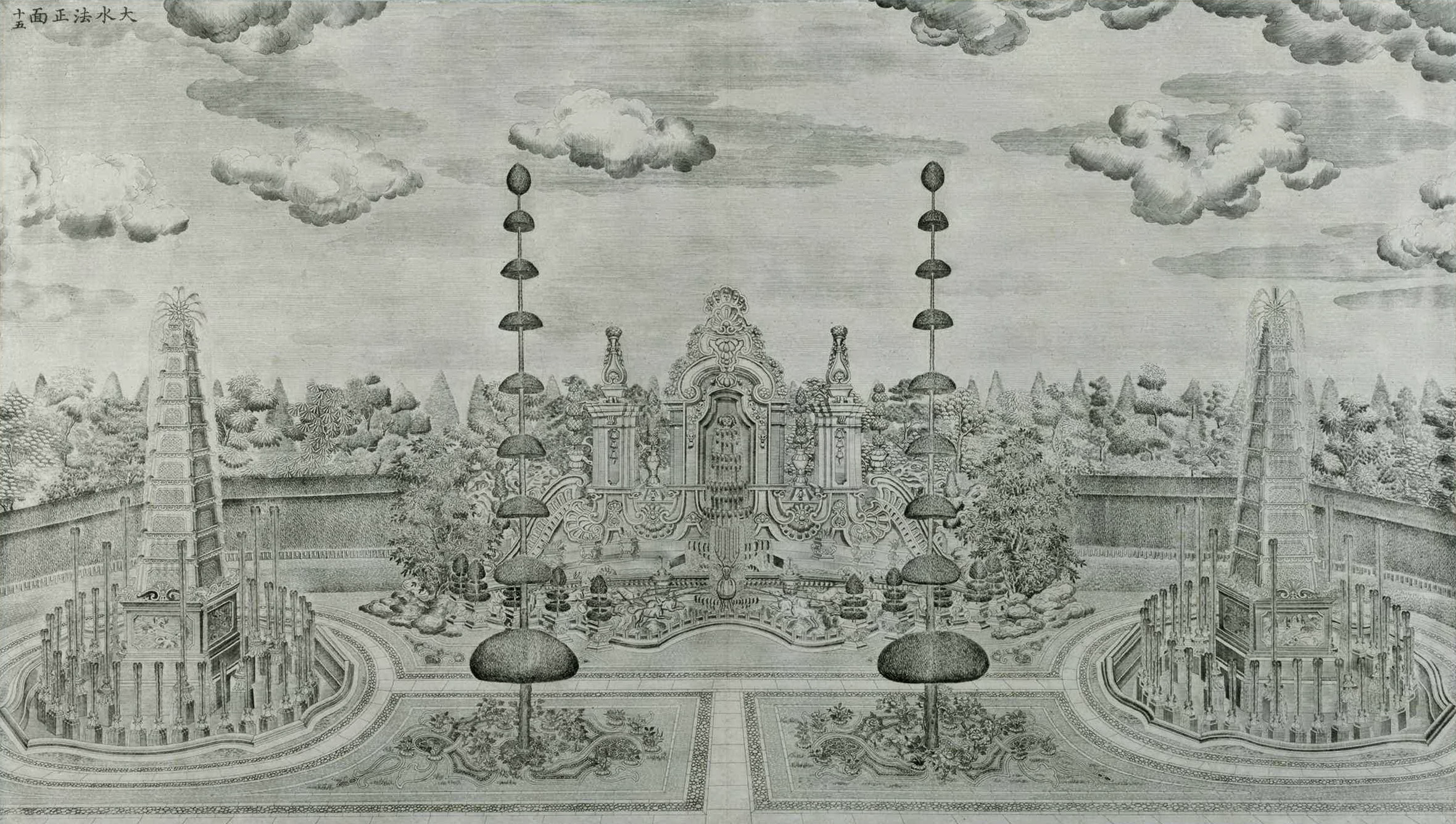
Dashuifa

The Xiyang Lou were commissioned by the Qianlong Emperor and designed mainly by the Italian Jesuit Giuseppe Castiglione who was in his service as a court painter. Castiglione relied on the French Jesuit scientist Michel Benoist for the engineering tasks, in particular for the fountains, which were the chief interest of the emperor. Construction was carried out by Chinese craftsmen working under their supervision with some further contributions by other European artists, such as the German Ignaz Sichelbarth and the Florentine Bonaventura Moggi.

Planning of the gardens started in 1747 and four years later in 1751, the first waterworks (Xieqiqu) were completed. Other milestones were the building of a large labyrinth (Huanghuazhen) in the years 1756 to 1759 and an observatory (Yuanying Guan) which was added in 1783.

Like the rest of the Old Summer Palace, the Xiyang Lou was destroyed in a fire laid by the Anglo-French allied forces in 1860 during the Second Opium War in response to the imprisonment and torture of their peace delegation by the Chinese. However, since the masonry work was not consumed by the fire, significant ruins of many of the buildings can still be found on the site.

Some conservation work on the site was carried out between 1977 and 1992. The Huanghuazhen labyrinth was rebuilt during this time.

== Architecture ==
The centerpiece of the Xiyang Lou complex were several waterworks around which the major buildings were arranged. The buildings showcased distinctive European style elements, in particular of Italian baroque. The Grand Trianon apparently served as important source of inspiration. However, numerous design elements of Chinese origin were also included making the result a mixture of European and Chinese architecture.

The main structures of the Xiyang Lou are: the Huanghuazhen labyrinth, the Xieqiqu (Harmonious Wonder) waterworks, the Yang Que Long (a gate with aviaries), the Fangwai Guan (belvedere), the Haiyan Tang (Hall of National Peace), the Yuan Ying Guan (Immense Ocean Observatory), the Da Shui Fa (Grand Waterworks), the Guan Shui Fa (Throne for Viewing the Waterworks), and the Xian Fa Shan (Hall of Perspective).

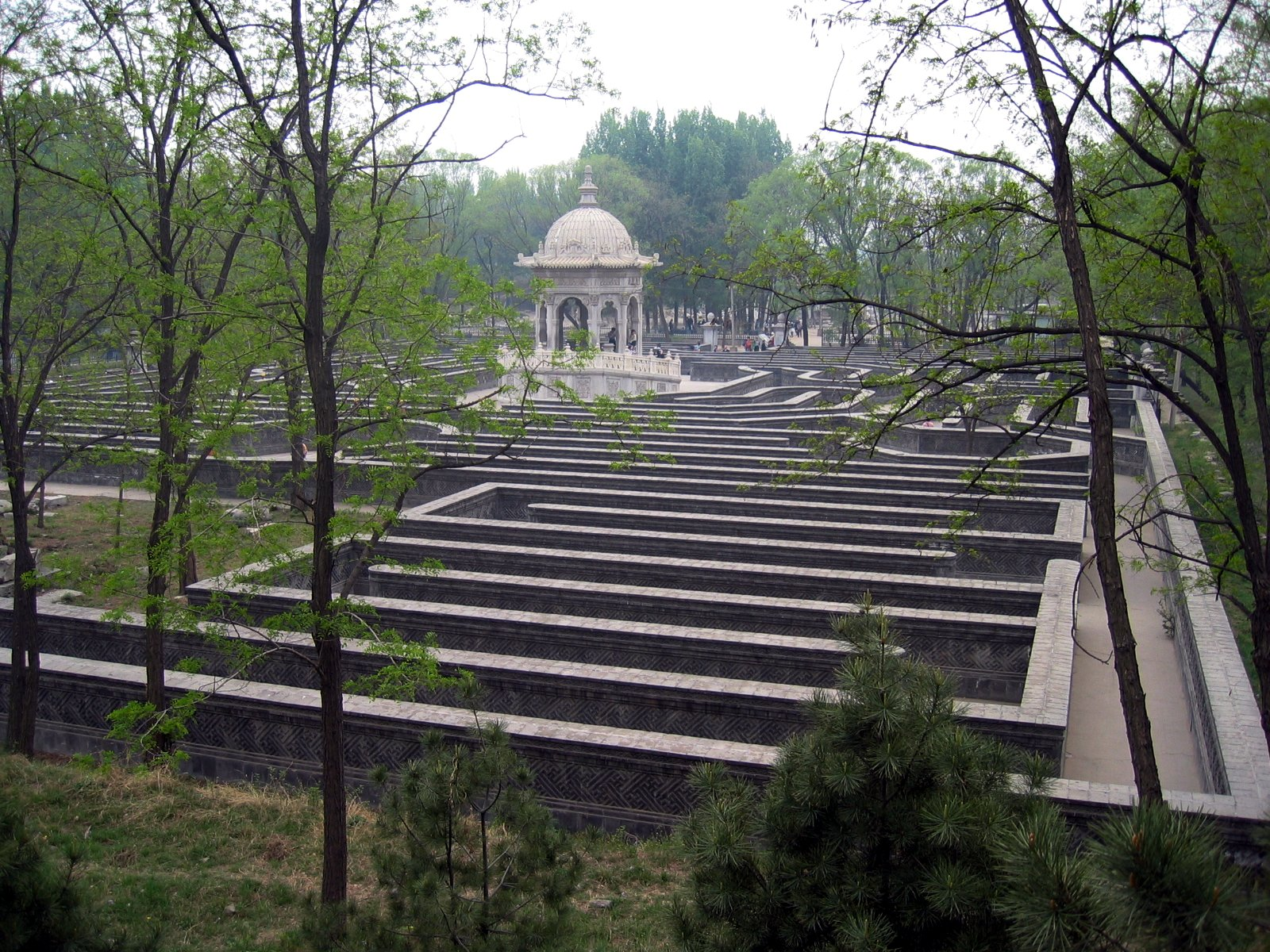
Wànhuāzhèn maze

=== Wanhua Zhen (Huánghuāzhèn) ===
The Wanhua Zhen (simplified Chinese: 万花阵; traditional Chinese: 萬花陣; pinyin: Wànhuā Zhèn; lit. '10 000-flower maze'), or Huanghuazhen (simplified Chinese: 黄花阵; traditional Chinese: 黃花陣; pinyin: Huánghuāzhèn; lit. 'yellow-flower maze', 40°0′44.46″N 116°18′8.10″E) is a maze formed of 1.2 m (3 ft 11 in)-high embossed-brick walls covering an area of 89 m × 59 m (292 ft × 194 ft). The total length of the walls is 1.6 km (0.99 mi). In its center sits a European-style circular pavilion. The emperor is said to have sat in this pavilion to watch his concubines competing in a race with yellow lanterns through the labyrinth on the occasion of the Mid-Autumn Festival.

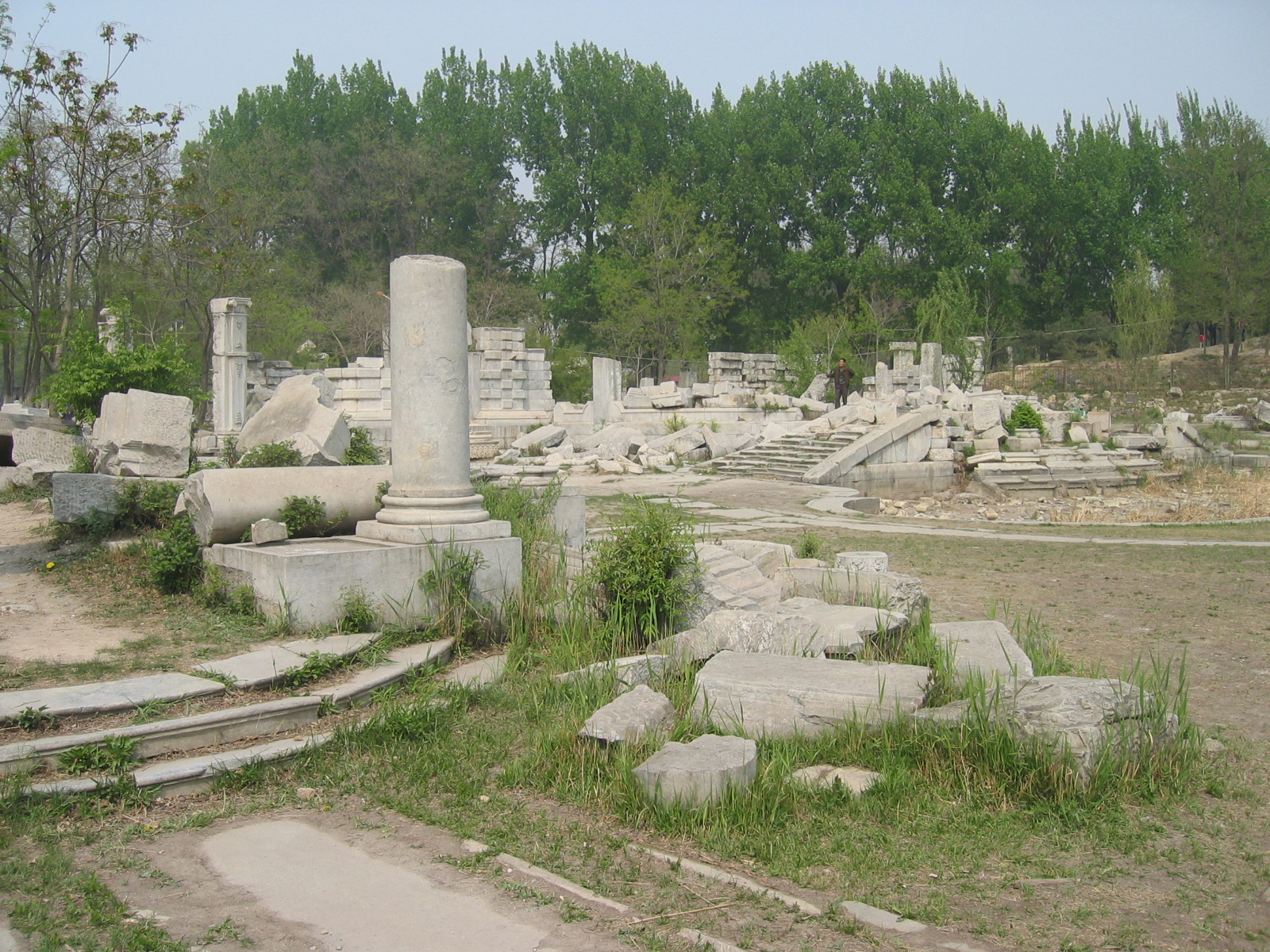
Ruins of the Xieqiqu

=== Xieqiqu ===
The Xieqiqu (谐奇趣, lit. 'Harmonious Wonder') is located in the southwest corner of the Xiyang Lou. The complex is noted for containing China's first European-style water feature. The basins of the key fountains had a floral layout (shaped like crabapple or chrysanthemum flowers); they were fed by bronze waterspouts in the shape of animals (rams, ducks, fish). Water for the fountains came from a water tower which was filled by a mule-drawn water wheel.

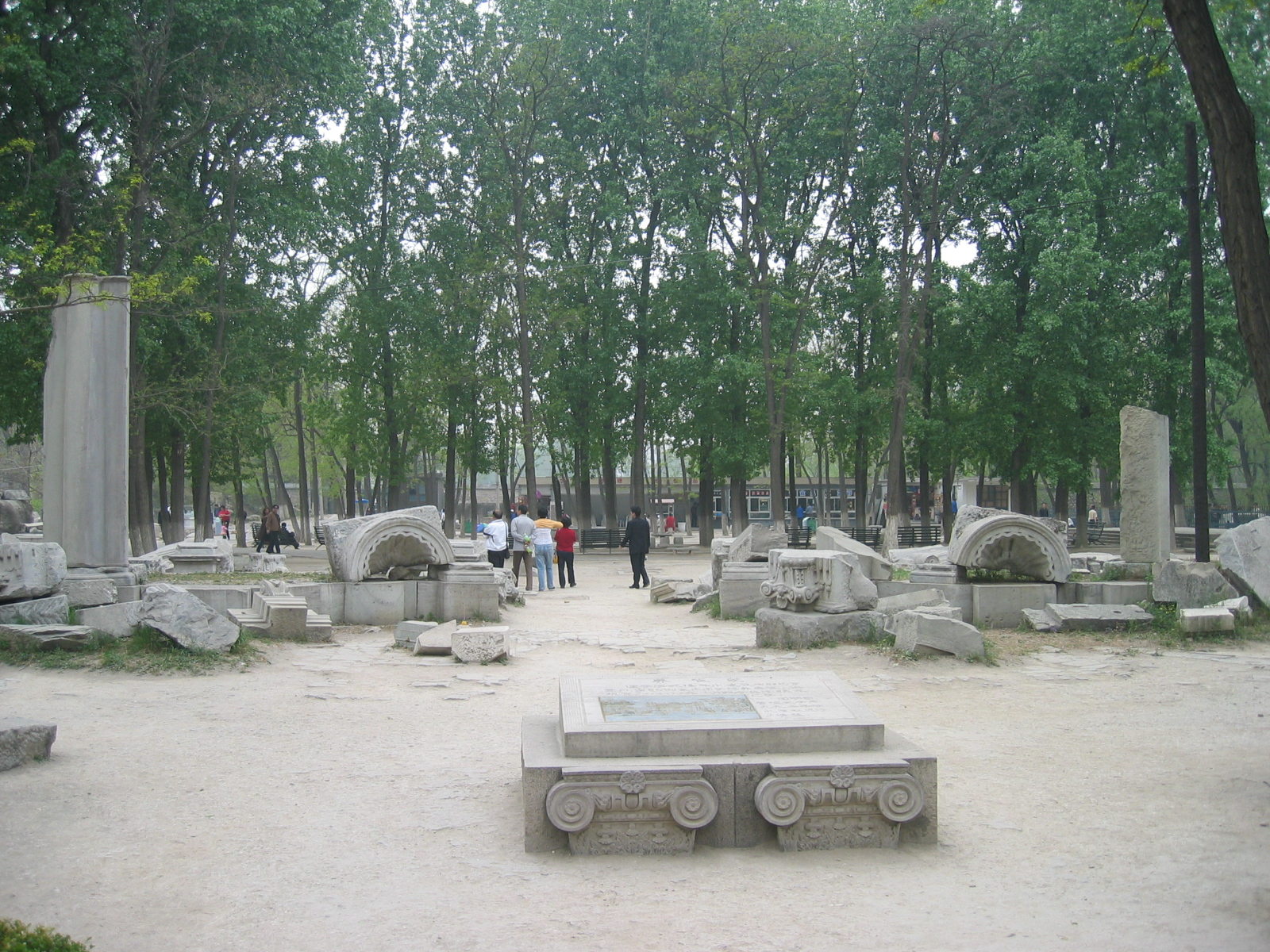
Ruins of the Yang Que Long

=== Yangquelong ===
The Yangquelong (养雀笼, lit. 'Bird-Raising Cage') was a European-style gateway (archway) with side-wings housing aviaries. It is located towards the western end of the main east–west axis of the complex and was built in 1759.

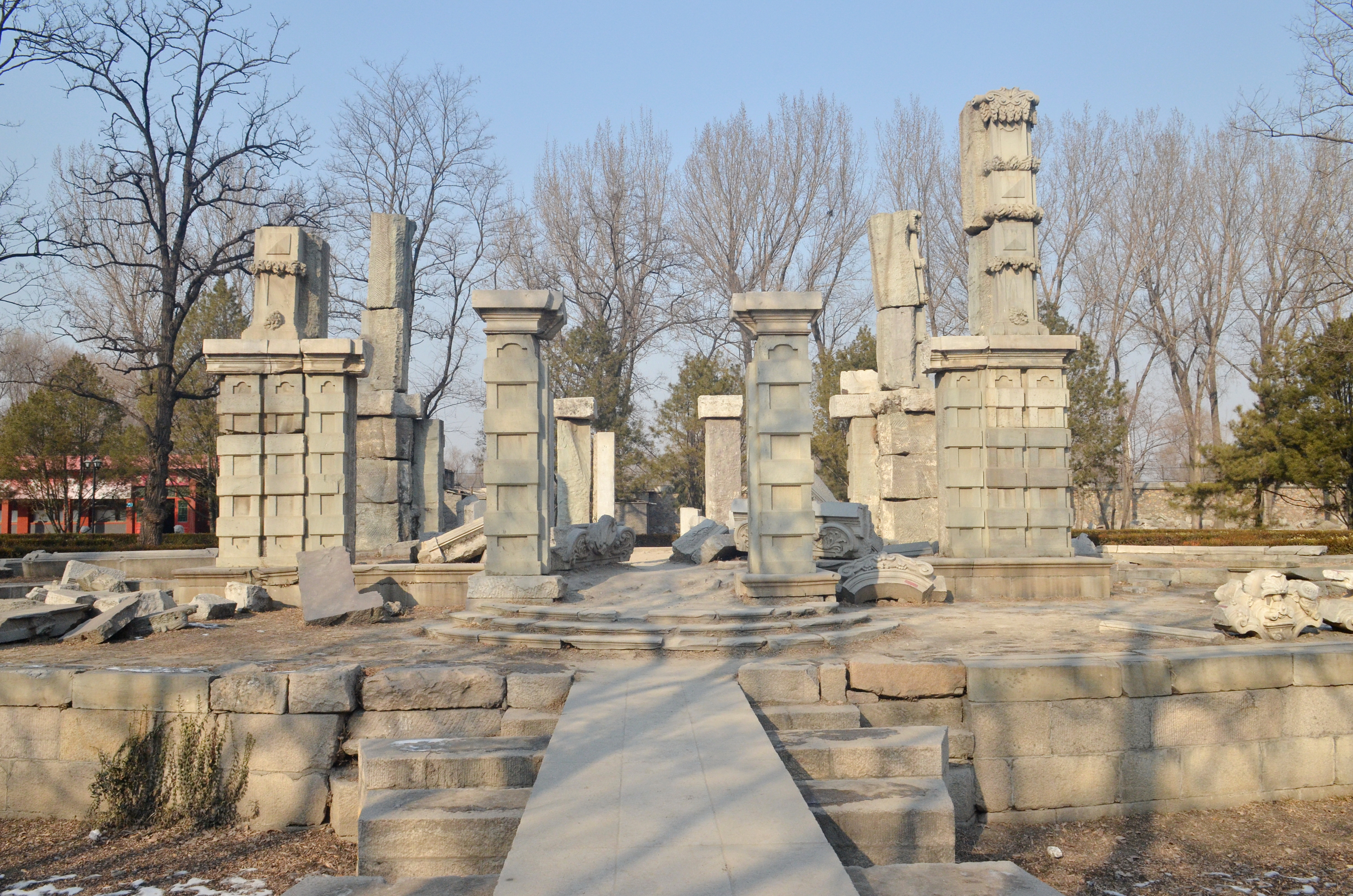
Ruins of the Fang Wai Guan

=== Fangwai Guan ===
The Fangwai Guan (Belvedere, 方外观) is a mansion located north-east of the Yangquelong and facing south. It was built in 1759 and was originally two stories tall. The mansion was decorated with European-style landscape paintings. Some of the artwork was done by the French Jesuit painter Jean Denis Attiret (1702–1768), others were designed by Giuseppe Castiglione. The mansion is said to have been frequented by a Uyghur concubine Consort Rong in favor with the Qianlong Emperor and have contained tablets inscribed in Arabic which were lost in the early 20th century.

=== Wuzhu Ting ===
The Wuzhu Ting (五竹亭, Five Bamboo Pavilions) were located opposite to the southern front of the Fangwai Guan. The ensemble consisted of five pavilions with double-eaved roofs connected by bamboo verandas. However, the building complex has been lost completely.

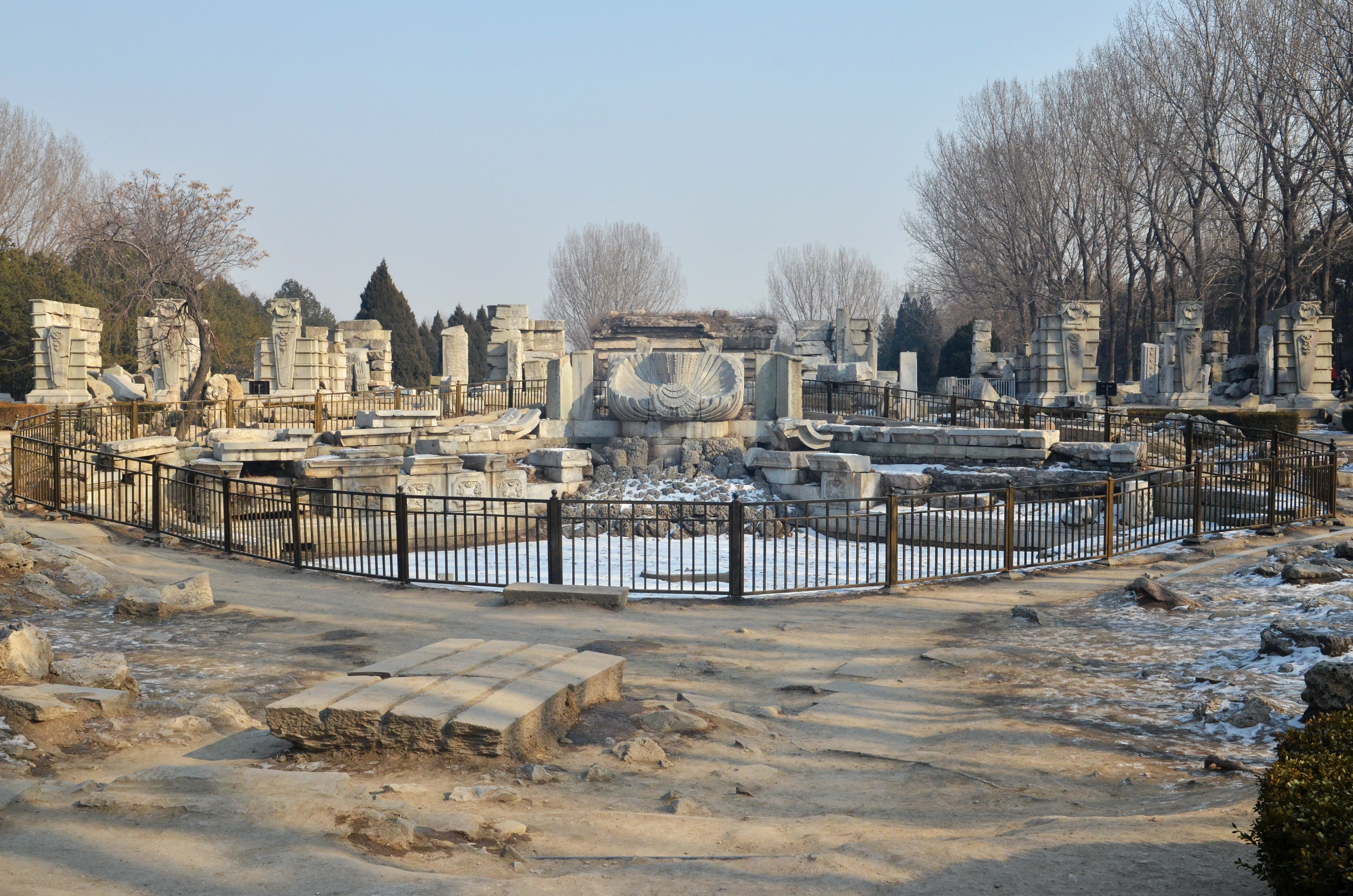
Ruins of the Hai Yan Tang

=== Haiyan Tang ===
The Haiyan Tang (海晏堂, Hall of National Peace) is a building and garden complex erected east of the Fangwai Guan in 1759. It consisted of a two-storied main building with a large fountain in front and an h-shaped water tower behind it. The fountain was known as the "Water Clock" because it was surrounded by twelve bronze waterspouts in the shape of human bodies with animal heads which were successively activated every two hours.

=== Yuanying Guan, Dashuifa, and Guanshuifa ===
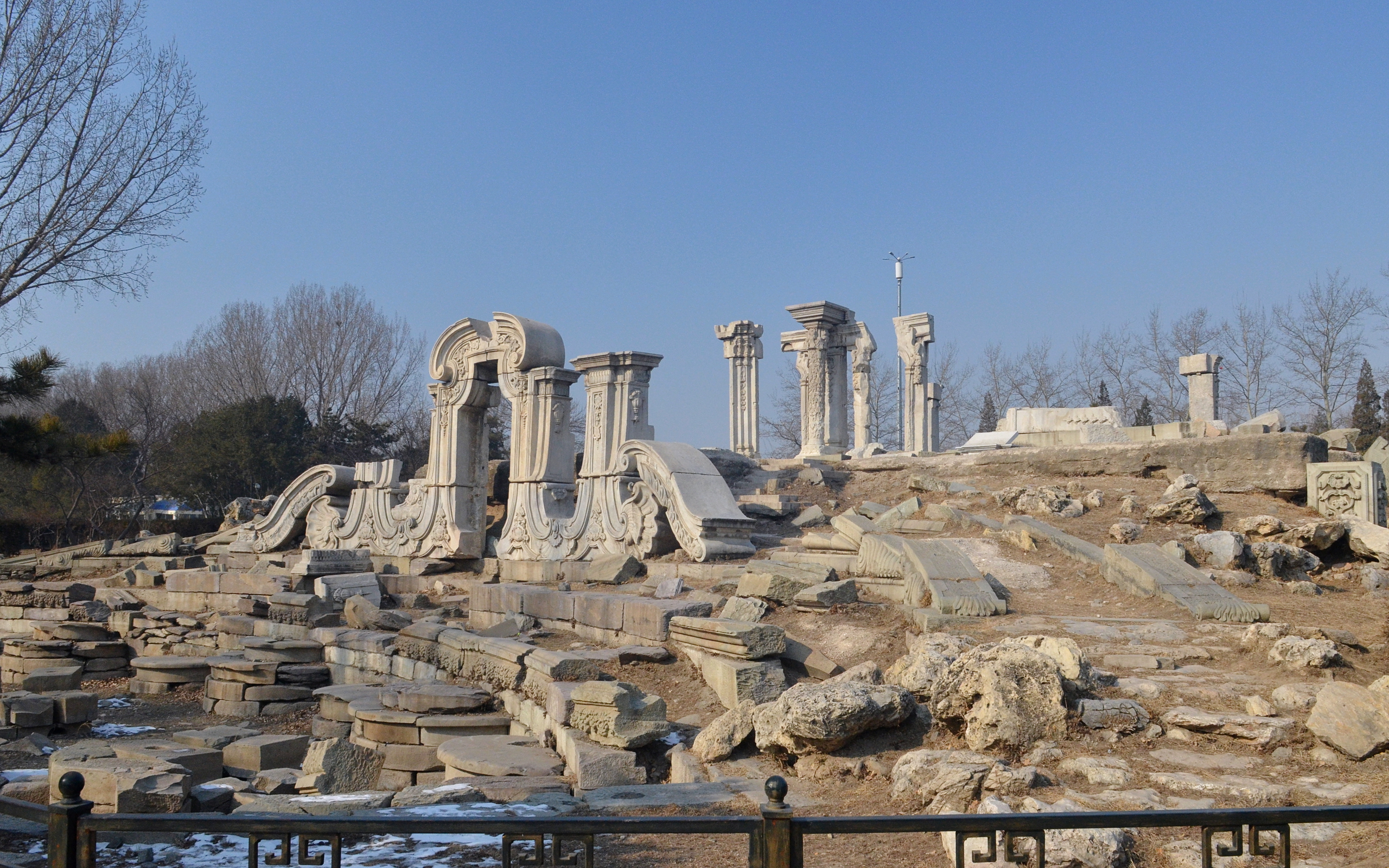
Ruins of the Yuanying Guan

The Yuanying Guan (远瀛观, Immense Ocean Observatory), the Dashuifa waterworks (Chinese: 大水法; pinyin: Dàshuǐfǎ, 40°0′43.45″N 116°18′23.73″E), and the throne of the Guanshuifa (观水法) are located at the center of the Xiyang Lou complex, where the form a much shorter north–south axis. The Yuanying Guan was a large building with a central archway supported by tall white marble pillars. Some of the richly-carved masonry work can still be seen in the ruins which remain today. South of the observatory, in the center of the complex was the Dashuifa, a group of elaborate fountains. The Guanshuifa, to the south of the grand fountains served as a throne for the emperor to observe the water displays.

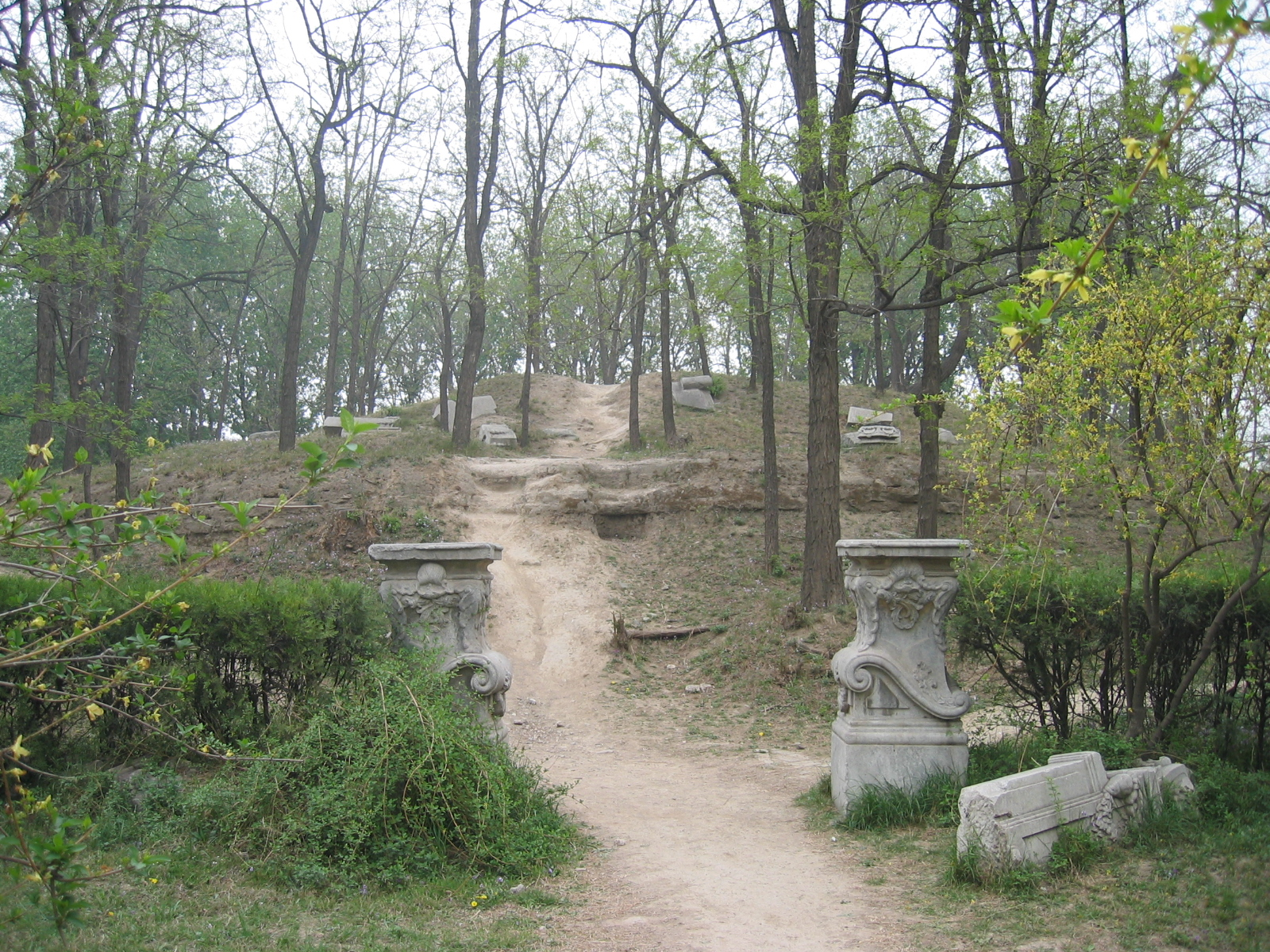
Ruins of the Xian Fa Shan

=== Xianfa Shan ===
The Xianfa Shan (线法山, lit. 'Perspective Hill') is a round hill east of the center of the Xiyang Lou. Its name derives from perspective painting which was introduced to China by the western artists who worked on the buildings. On top of the hill stood an octagonal pavilion of which only scattered stone blocks survive.

=== Xianfa Hua ===
The Xianfa Hua (线法画) was a display of perspective paintings of European landscapes. The paintings were arranged on seven pairs of symmetric walls to give the viewer the impression that he was actually looking out onto a European landscape. The display marks the eastern end of the Xiyang Lou complex.
