= New Beijing Poly Plaza =

- 新保利大厦
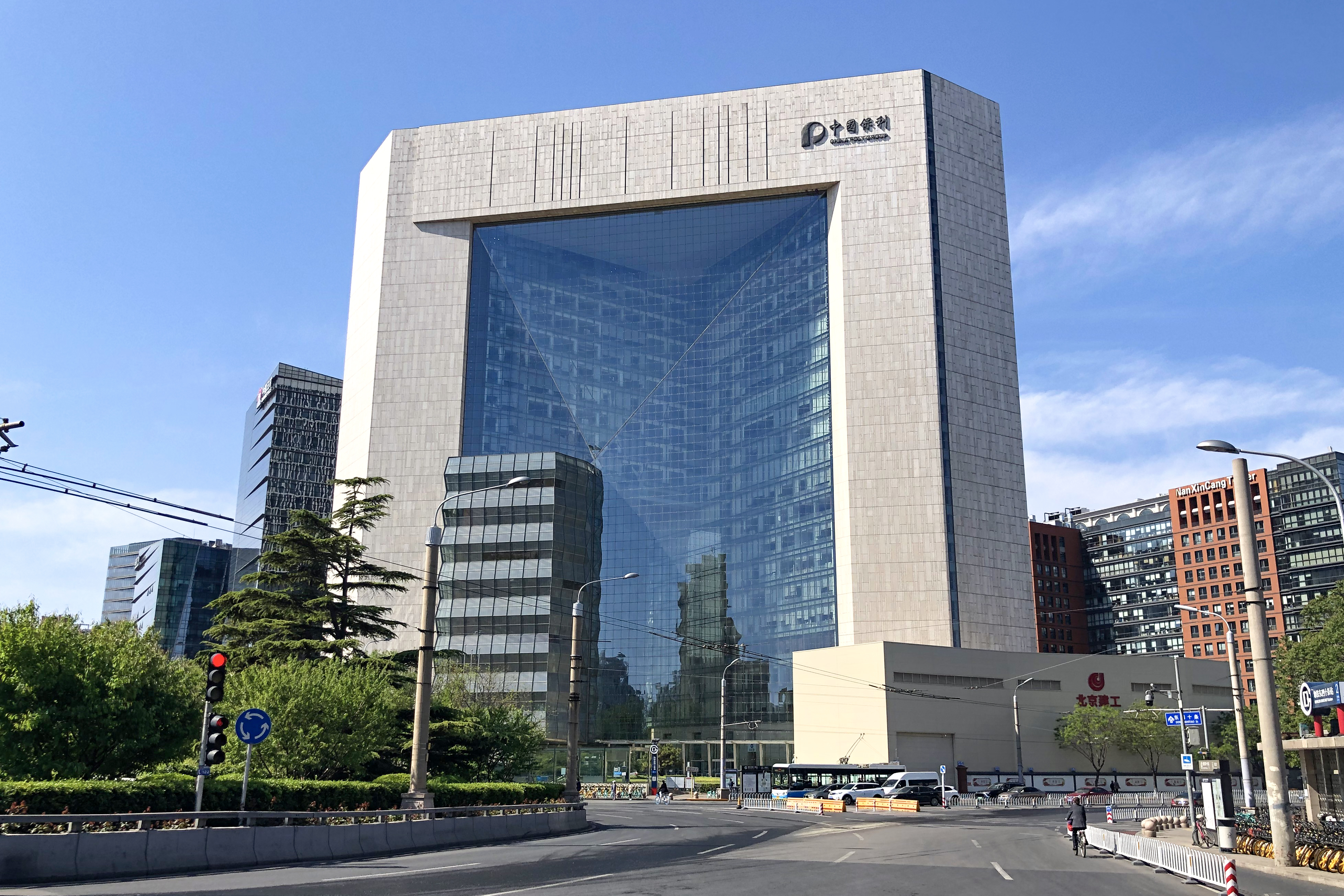
- Interactive map of the New Beijing Poly Plaza area

General information
- Type: Office/mixed
- Location: Chaoyangmen North Street, Dongcheng, Beijing, China
- Coordinates: 39.9316°N 116.426°E
- Construction started: 2003
- Completed: 2007
- Cost: US$180 million
- Owner: China Poly Group Corporation

Height
- Height: 110 m

Technical details
- Floor count: 24
- Floor area: 103.308 m^{2}

Design and construction
- Architects: Skidmore, Owings and Merrill; Mark Sarkisian, P.E. S.E., Partner and Aaron Mazeika, P.E., Associate
- Structural engineer: Skidmore, Owings and Merrill for base building: Beijing Special Engineering Design and Research Institute wind engineer: Shifu Gu, Mechanics & Engineering Science Department, Peking University
- Main contractor: (cable nets) Yuanda China, Shenyang, China; Advanced Structures Inc., Culver City, California

The New Beijing Poly Plaza is a building complex in Dongcheng, Beijing, China. Completed in 2007 for the China Poly Group Corporation, it houses the company headquarters, other office space, retail, restaurants, and the Poly Museum.

The New Beijing Poly Plaza sits northeast of the Forbidden City on the 2nd Ring Road, near the Beijing Subway entrance of Exit D of Dongsi Shitiao Station of Line 2. Its large atrium looks out onto a major highway intersection and across the road to the earlier China Poly Headquarters.

== Architecture ==
For their new headquarters, China Poly Group wanted a design that would reflect their multiple corporate interests in a unified structure.

The structure has three main components: an L-shaped office building, a 21-story high glass-enclosed atrium, and a hanging structure referred to as the 'lantern.'

The overall footprint on the 65,000-square-meter site is of a right triangle. Each leg of the L-shaped building measures 76.5 m long by 22.5 m wide. The hypotenuse of the triangle is formed by a glass cable-net wall faces northeast, and reduces the overall exterior surface area of the building, helping to moderate the interior climate. The south and west walls of the building deflect direct summer sun with a travertine fin-wall and brise soleil shades that don't obstruct views. The travertine façade is illuminated with fluorescent lights, emphasizing even at night the building's play of light and shadow. Iits surface is perforated with smaller atria inset into the office bars, allowing light into the interior and for views through the building. The building is framed in steel and concrete composite.

The glass cable-net wall construction is the world's largest, measuring 90 meters high by 60 meters wide, four times the size of the cable-net wall at the Time Warner Center in New York. The wall is counterweighted with an 8-story "lantern" structure hanging from four parallel strand cables. The largest of these cables is 275 mm diameter, consisting of 199 parallel strands of 15.2 mm diameter. Each strand is made up of seven wires twisted around a central wire. The glass wall is also rigged to these v-shaped cables, reducing the effective distance the wall cables must span. This unique design allows for such a large cable-net wall, and for the lantern. The lantern structure, essentially a building hanging from another building, has no support columns at the ground. It is attached to the cables with v-shaped rocker mechanisms that are designed to maintain tension in a seismic event, keeping the lantern fixed in place.

== The Poly Museum ==
The lantern structure houses the Poly Museum, whose goal is to repatriate China's cultural antiquities and whose collection bronze antiquities is one of the foremost in the country. It is referred to as the lantern for its resemblance to a pleated Chinese lantern. The glass pleats increase reflection and refraction in the atrium and building exterior, while interior bronze walls contain the exhibition spaces of the museum. Public walkways between the glass and bronze walls bring the play of light and shadow to the interior of the hanging structure.

== Awards ==
2011 – AIA San Francisco Chapter: Constructed Realities: Architectural Detail Honor Award
2011 – Architect Magazine: R + D Award
2010 – Beijing Modern: Top Ten Building Prize
2010 – China Tien-Yow Jeme: Civil Engineering Prize
2010 – Urban Land Institute: Award for Excellence: Finalist
2009 – Beijing Municipal Information Department: Beijing Top Ten Buildings Award
2008 – AIA Hong Kong: Merit Award
2008 – Chicago Athenaeum: American Architecture Award
2008 – Chicago Athenaeum: International Architecture Award
2008 – MIPIM Asia: Business Centre Category
2007 – Institution of Structural Engineers: Award for Commercial or Retail Structure
2007 – National Council of Structural Engineers Association: Excellence in Structural Engineering: Award of Merit
2007 – Structural Engineers Association of California: Award of Excellence: Landmark Structures Category
2007 – Structural Engineers Association of Illinois: Excellence in Structural Engineering: Most Innovative Structure
2007 – Structural Engineers Association of Northern California: Award of Excellence: New Construction Category
2006 – General Electric Company: Edison Award for Excellence in Lighting Design
2005 – Beijing Quality Project Evaluation Committee: Great Wall Cup: Gold Medal
