= Portrait of a Thief =

2022 novel

- Author: Grace D. Li
- Language: English
- Genre: Crime, thriller, mystery, young adult
- Publisher: Tiny Reparations
- Publication date: April 5, 2022
- Pages: 384
- ISBN: 978-0-593-18473-8

Portrait of a Thief is the 2022 debut novel by Chinese American author Grace D. Li. Following a crew of five Chinese Americans, the novel combines elements of an art heist of looted art with an examination of colonialism and Chinese American identity. It was immediately a New York Times Best Seller and later named a New York Times Best Crime Novel of 2022.

In 2021, ahead of its official publication, Netflix acquired the rights to the book, and it is currently in development as a television series.

== Synopsis ==
The novel follows Will Chen, a senior at Harvard, when he is contracted by a Chinese billionaire to steal back five bronze fountainheads from different museums and return them to China, the justification being that the artifacts were looted during the Second Opium War. His heist crew eventually grows to include four other Chinese Americans with various backgrounds, rationales, and skill sets: Irene Chen, Daniel Liang, Lily Wu, and Alex Huang. In return for the five pieces, the crew is promised a $50 million payout.

== Critical reception ==
Kirkus Reviews found it a "compelling portrait of the Chinese diaspora experience" but commented that it "doesn't quite land as either literary fiction or thriller."

Several publications, like USA Today, CBC, and The Boston Globe, lauded Li's timely, poignant commentary on ethical questions raised around museum inventories in the west.

The New York Times found that "The thefts are engaging and surprising, and the narrative brims with international intrigue" while also admiring Li's commentary on the Chinese American experience. KQED observed that Li's "writing shows great control at the line level and of the overall narrative."

The novel was a finalist for the Edgar Award for Best First Novel and shortlisted for the Center for Fiction First Novel Prize. Prior to its release, several publications, such as NBC News and Marie Claire, placed the book on lists for anticipated reads.

== Adaptations ==
The novel is set to become a television series on Netflix, which acquired the rights of the book in May 2021 before the book was published. Executive producers include Michael Sugar of Sugar23, Grace D. Li, Ashley Zalta, and Margaux Swerdloff.
