= Michel Benoist =

- Born: 8 October 1715; Dijon, France
- Died: 23 October 1774 (aged 59); Beijing, China
- Occupation: Scientist

Michel Benoist (Chinese: 蔣友仁; pinyin: Jiǎng Yǒurén, 8 October 1715 in Dijon, France – 23 October 1774 in Beijing, China) was a Jesuit scientist who served for thirty years in the court of the Qianlong Emperor (1735 - 1796) during the Qing dynasty, known for his architectural and landscape designs of the Old Summer Palace (Yuanming Yuan). Along with Giuseppe Castiglione, Benoist served as one of two Jesuit advisors to the Qianlong Emperor, and transformed parts of the Old Summer Palace into what historian Mark Elliott calls an "imitation of Versailles or Fontainebleau."

== Early life ==
Michel Benoist was born on 8 October 1715 in Dijon, France. The name Benoist is an archaic form of the name "Benoît," and both are used interchangeably in textual sources. Benoist studied in Dijon and at Saint Sulpice, Paris. He entered the Jesuit Novitiate at Nancy on 18 March 1737 and was formally ordained as a Jesuit priest in Trier in 1739. Shortly after, he left for Paris to study mathematics, astronomy, and hydraulics under Nicolas-Louis de Lacaille and Louis Guillaume Le Monnier, two members of the French Academy of Sciences. It was under their guidance that Benoist studied architecture, preparing for his work with the Qing court. Benoist was then sent to China on behalf of the Society of Jesus, arriving initially at Macao and finally to Beijing in 1744.

== Jesuits and the Qianlong Emperor ==
When Michel Benoist arrived at the court of the Qianlong Emperor, the role of Jesuits had transformed. Although Jesuits were kept at the court since the reign of the Kangxi Emperor, their powers to proselytize in the Qing Empire were reduced dramatically. According to Jesuit scholar Jean Charbonnier, the imperial decree of 1724 was a drastic change for Catholic missionaries, enforcing draconian measures to limit the spread of Christianity. By the time of the ascent of the Qianlong Emperor, the role of Jesuit missionaries was reinvented. As Mark Elliot notes in his biography of the Qianlong Emperor, Jesuits were allowed to learn and document Manchu and Chinese languages and culture in return for their service to the Qianlong court as subjects. Like many Jesuits, Michel Benoist entered the court knowing it was unlikely for him to return to his homeland.

== Works ==
Over the course of thirty years, Michel Benoist served the Qianlong Emperor on a number of construction projects and as an advisor on European affairs. The Qianlong Emperor revered Benoist as a source of intellect and a window into the ideas of the European Enlightenment. According to Joanna Waley-Cohen, the Qianlong Emperor and Benoist conversed over various topics such as "Western science, philosophy, warfare, cartography, shipping, and navigational practices,” accentuating the cosmopolitan interests of the Qianlong Emperor. Many of Benoist's accomplishments have been documented by two authors: Louis Pfister (1833 - 1891), and Alphose Favier (1837 - 1905), a Catholic bishop based in Beijing.

=== Yuanming Yuan ===
During the second year of his reign in 1737, the Qianlong Emperor commissioned Giuseppe Castiglione to construct multiple European-style pavilions (Xiyanglou) on the grounds of the Old Summer Palace. Michel Benoist oversaw the construction of Castiglione's designs, taking over construction following Castiglione's death in 1766, and helped design multiple parts of the palace. His studies in hydraulics were used for designing various fountains throughout the palace. His greatest achievement was the construction of a "water clock" in front of The Hall of Calm Seas, a building arguably based on the Court of Honor at Versailles. The clock consisted of a fountain basin surrounded by 12 statues depicting the animals of the Chinese zodiac, with each zodiac associated with the 12 Chinese hours dictated by the Earthly Branches System. Using a hydraulic system designed by Benoist, each statue spewed water from the mouth of each animal for a consecutive hour, and was among the first water jet systems developed in China.

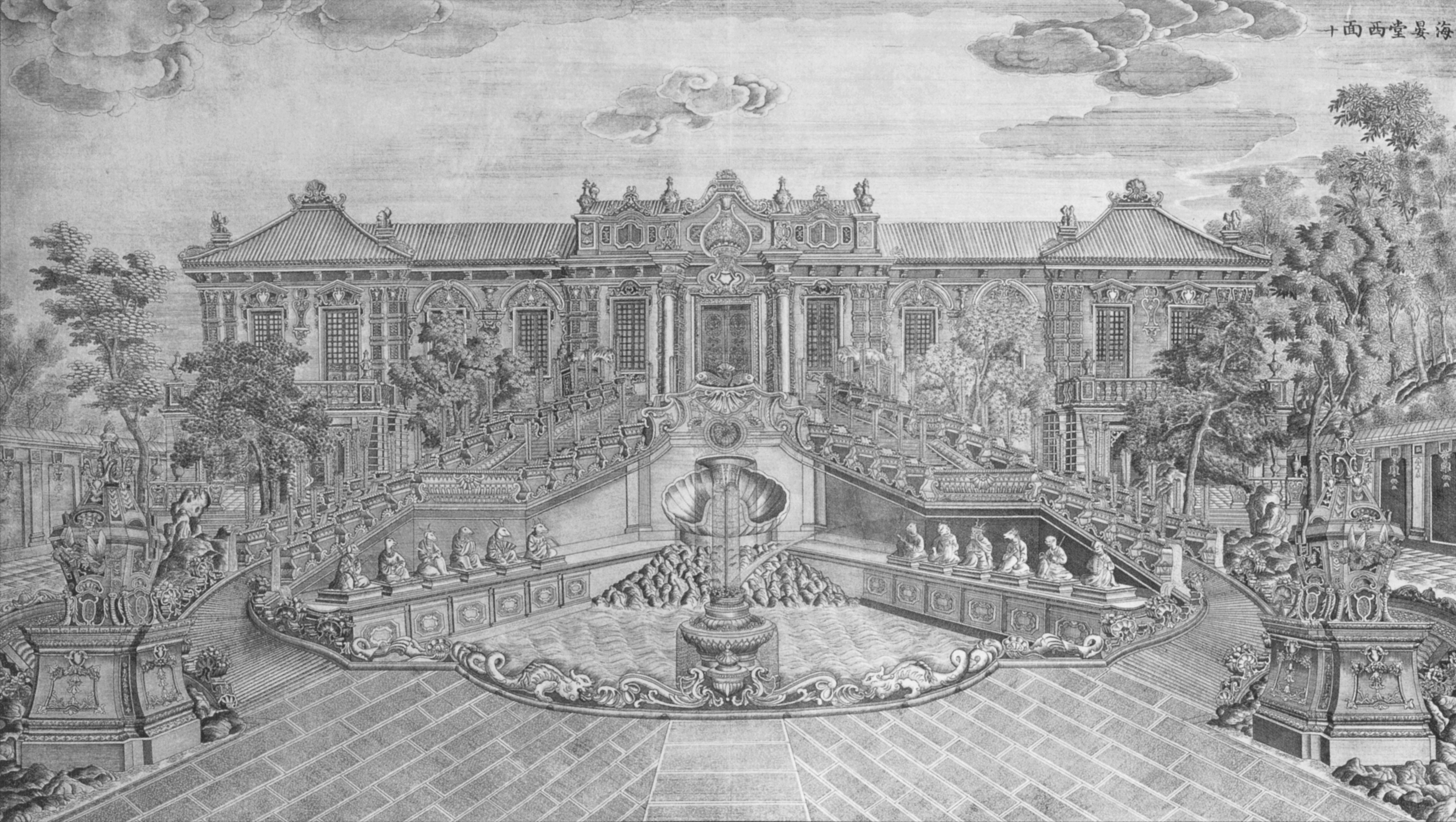
An 18th century engraving depicting the water clock designed by Benoist featuring the twelve animals of the Chinese zodiac in front of The Hall of Calm Seas (Haiyantang).

=== World Map ===
Benoist worked on numerous cartography projects for the Qianlong Emperor. His first cartography project was mapping out the territories of the Qing Empire and its borderlands, following up on previous work by Jesuits during the reign of the Kangxi Emperor. Historian Mario Cams notes Benoist's maps visually incorporated distant territories such as Xinjiang into the boundaries and defined borderlands between Qing China, Mongolia, and Imperial Russia. Benoist then produced a large world map on the walls of Yuanming Yuan. The map helped familiarize the Qianlong Emperor with the geography of Europe and his empire, and according to historian Mark Elliott prepared the Emperor for the later arrival of the British Macartney Embassy in 1793.

=== Astronomy ===
Because of his training in astronomy, Benoist helped establish European studies of astronomy to Qing China. Historian Nathan Sivin notes that Benoist was the first to introduce Copernican cosmology in China "after the church's ban on Copernican cosmology ended in 1757." Benoist's presentation of Copernican theory stood in contrast from previous Jesuit advisors that either ignored Copernicus's ideas or contradicted one another. For instance, German Jesuit Schall von Bell previously argued that the planets and the sun moved in a circular motion, while Benoist argued the sun was a static body. Benoist, according to Sivin, was not only among the greatest champions of the Copernican model in China, but was also one of the last successful Jesuit scientists to do so.

Benoist also instructed the Qianlong Emperor on use of the telescope for the observation of celestial bodies.

=== Other work ===
Benoist set up a printing shop to produce prints of historic battle scenes from a set of copper engravings which had been gifted from King Louis XV in 1772, and was the last of Benoist's contributions to the Qianlong Court.

== Death ==
Michel Benoist died in Beijing, China on 23 October 1774 of a stroke. He died at 59 years old, shortly after learning of the formal suppression of the Society of Jesus in Europe. His body was interred at the Zhengfusi cemetery on the outskirts a Beijing. In his honor, the Qianlong Emperor funded his funeral with "one hundred pieces of silver." Zhengfusi was one of two cemeteries dedicated to Jesuits in service in China. The first, Zhalan, was a cemetery built in 1611 that interred Jesuits such as Matteo Ricci, while Zhengfusi was built in 1732 for the French Jesuit community.

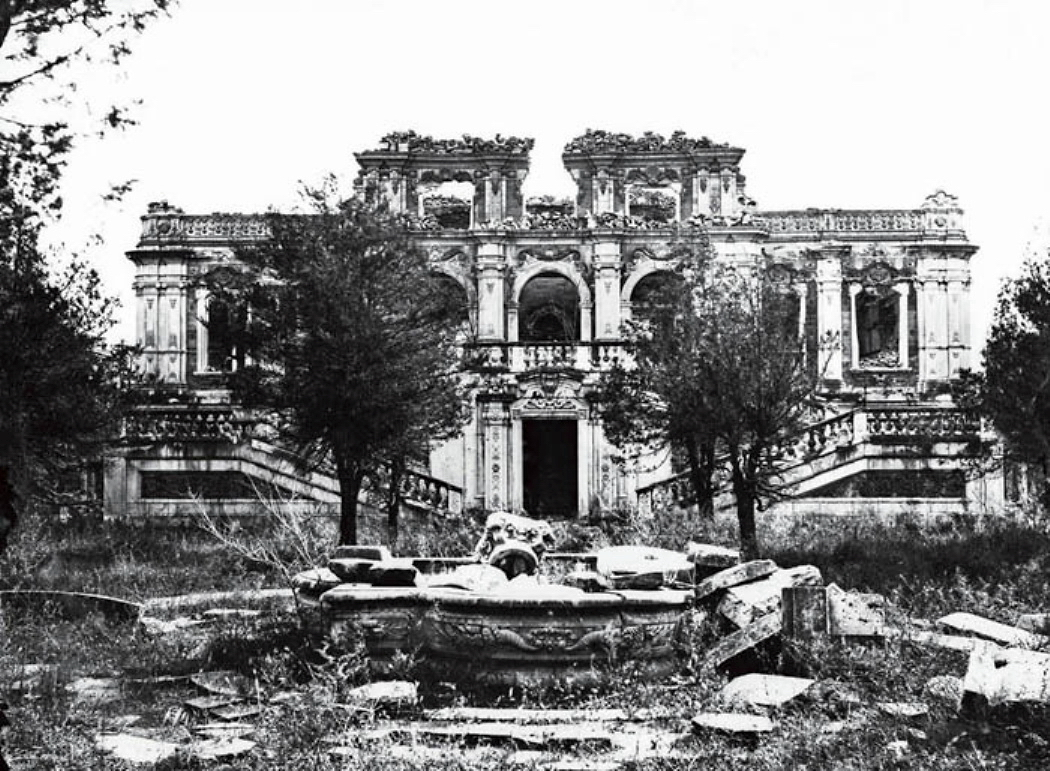
Ruins of the north facade of Xieqiqu, one of the pavilions to feature the fountains constructed by Michel Benoist. The photograph was taken in 1873 by German photographer Ernst Ohlmer.

Many of Benoist's accomplishments were destroyed during the Second Opium war. Following the invasion of Beijing by British and French forces, Lord Elgin ordered the looting and destruction of Yuanming Yuan as retribution for the execution of European journalists and prisoners of wars by Qing forces. The ruins were again destroyed during the Boxer Rebellion of 1900.

== See also ==
- Religion in China
- Jesuit China missions
- Christianity in China
- List of Jesuit scientists
- Old Summer Palace

=== Catholic missionaries in China ===
- Giuseppe Castiglione
- Armand David
- Matteo Ricci
- Johann Adam Schall von Bell
- Ferdinand Verbiest
- St. Francis Xavier

=== Protestant missionaries in China ===
See separate article List of Protestant missionaries in China.
