= Watermelon stereotype =

Anti-Black racist trope from the US

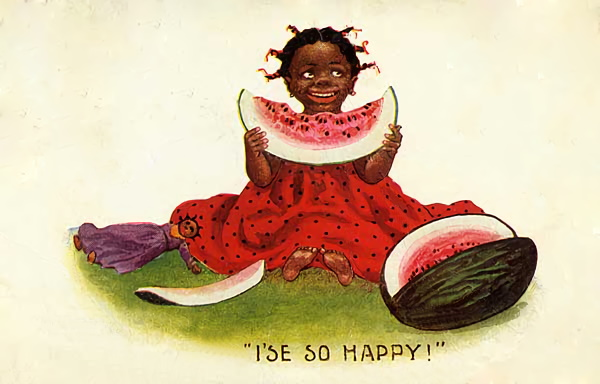
1909 postcard with the caption "I'se so happy!"

The watermelon stereotype is an anti-Black, racist trope originating in the Southern United States. It first arose as a backlash against African American emancipation and economic self-sufficiency in the late 1860s. After the American Civil War, in several areas of the South, formerly enslaved individuals grew watermelon on their own land as a cash crop to sell. Thus, for African Americans, watermelons were a symbol of liberation and self-reliance. However, for many in the majority white culture, watermelons embodied and threatened a loss of dominance. Southern White resentment against African Americans led to a politically potent cultural caricature, using the watermelon to disparage African Americans as childish and unclean, among other negative attributes.

For several decades in the late 19th century through to the mid 20th century, the stereotype was promoted through caricatures in print, film, sculpture and music, and was a common decorative theme on household goods.

== History ==
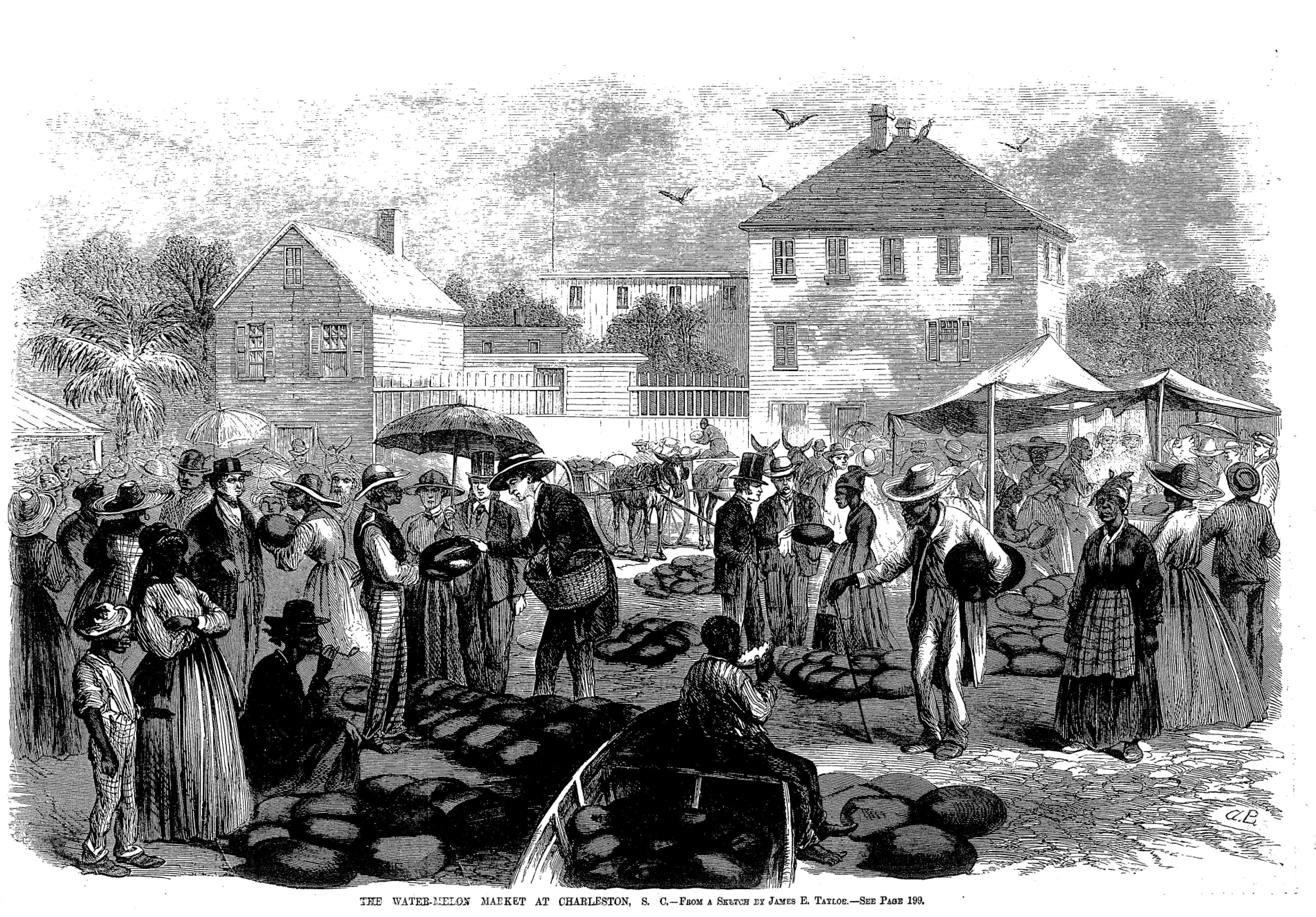
The first known image associating Black people with watermelons.

The first published caricature of Black people reveling in watermelon is believed to have appeared in Frank Leslie's Illustrated Newspaper in 1869. The stereotype emerged shortly after enslaved people were emancipated after the Civil War. Defenders of slavery used it to portray African Americans as a simple-minded people who were happy when provided with watermelon and a little rest. The enslaved peoples' enjoyment of watermelon was also seen by the Southern people as a sign of their own supposed benevolence. The stereotype was perpetuated in minstrel shows, often depicting African Americans as ignorant and lazy, given to song and dance and inordinately fond of watermelon.

The link between African Americans and watermelons may have been promoted in part by African American minstrels who sang popular songs such as "The Watermelon Song" and "Oh, Dat Watermelon" in their shows, and which were set down in print in the 1870s. The 1893 World's Columbian Exposition held in Chicago planned to include a "Colored People's Day" featuring African American entertainers and free watermelons for the African American visitors whom the exposition's organizers hoped to attract. It was a flop, as the city's African American community boycotted the exposition, along with many of the performers booked to attend on Colored People's Day.

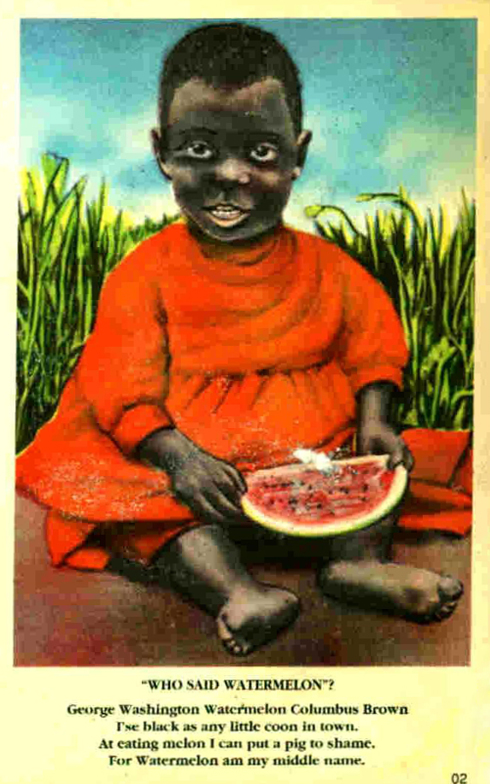
Pickaninny caricature from the early 1900s. The postcard shows a picture of a Black boy eating a watermelon, with a stereotypical poem underneath.

During the early 1900s, postcards often depicted African Americans as animalistic creatures "happy to do nothing but eat watermelon", which has been seen as a bid to dehumanize them. Other such "Coon cards", as they were popularly known, depicted African Americans stealing, fighting over, and becoming watermelons. One poem from the early 1900s (pictured right) reads:

George Washington Watermelon Columbus Brown
I'se black as any little coon in town
At eating melon I can put a pig to shame
For Watermelon am my middle name

At the end of the 19th century, there was a brief genre of "watermelon pictures" – cinematic caricatures of African American life showing such supposedly typical pursuits as eating watermelons, cakewalking and stealing chickens, with titles such as The Watermelon Contest (1896), Dancing Darkies (1896), Watermelon Feast (1896), and Who Said Watermelon? (1900, 1902). The African American characters in such features were initially played by Black performers, but from about 1903 onward, they were replaced by white actors performing in blackface.

Several of the films depicted African Americans as having a virtually uncontrollable appetite for watermelons; for instance, The Watermelon Contest and Watermelon Feast include scenes of African American men consuming the fruits at such a speed that they spew out mush and seeds. The author Novotny Lawrence suggests that such scenes had a subtext of representing Black male sexuality, in which Black men "love and desire the fruit in the same manner that they love sex... In short, black males have a watermelon 'appetite' and are always trying to see 'who can eat the most' with the strength of this 'appetite' depicted by black males uncontrollably devouring watermelon."

African American minstrels sang popular songs such as "The Watermelon Song" and "Oh, Dat Watermelon" in their shows, recorded in print in the 1870s.

In March 1916, Harry C. Browne recorded a song titled "Nigger Love a Watermelon Ha!, Ha! Ha!", set to the tune of the popular folk song "Turkey in the Straw". Such songs were popular during that period and many made use of the watermelon stereotype. The script for Gone with the Wind (1939) contained a scene in which Scarlett O'Hara's slave Prissy, played by Butterfly McQueen, eats watermelon, which the actress refused to perform.

== Contemporary usage ==
Use of this stereotype started to die down around the 1950s, and had mostly vanished by 1970, although its continued power as a stereotype could still be recognized in films such as Watermelon Man (1970), The Watermelon Woman (1996), and Bamboozled (2001).

During the CBS telecast of Game 5 of the 1981 NBA Finals, network analyst Rick Barry drew controversy by jokingly describing his African American colleague Bill Russell as "look[ing] like some fool over there with that big watermelon grin" when an old photo of the latter as part of the 1956 United States men's Olympic basketball team appeared onscreen. While Barry disavowed being aware of the possible racial overtones of the comment and Russell stated that he believed him, CBS did not renew his contract the following season.

Watermelons also provided a theme for many racial jokes in the 2000s. In 2002, British journalist (and later prime minister) Boris Johnson alluded to "piccaninies" with "watermelon smiles" in a Telegraph article about then-prime minister Tony Blair visiting West Africa, a description widely criticized as racist and out of touch.

Those with racist beliefs against African Americans frequently hold up watermelons during rallies, among other things; imagery of Barack Obama consuming watermelon was subject of viral emails circulated by political opponents during the 2008 Obama presidential campaign. After his election to the US presidency, watermelon-themed imagery of Obama continued to be created and endorsed. In February 2009, Los Alamitos Mayor Dean Grose resigned (albeit temporarily) after forwarding to the White House an email displaying a picture of the White House lawn planted with watermelons. Grose said that he was not aware of the watermelon stereotype. Other controversies included a statue of Obama holding a watermelon in Kentucky in 2012 and a 2014 editorial cartoon in the Boston Herald asking if Obama has tried watermelon-flavored toothpaste.

At the National Book Awards ceremony in November 2014, author Daniel Handler made a controversial remark after author Jacqueline Woodson was presented with an award for young people's literature. Woodson, who is Black, won the award for Brown Girl Dreaming. During the ceremony, Handler noted that Woodson is allergic to watermelon, a reference to the racist stereotype. His comments were immediately criticized; Handler apologized via Twitter and donated $10,000 to We Need Diverse Books, and promised to match donations up to $100,000. In a New York Times op-ed published shortly thereafter, "The Pain of the Watermelon Joke", Jacqueline Woodson explained that "in making light of that deep and troubled history" with his joke, Daniel Handler had come from a place of ignorance, but underscored the need for her mission to "give people a sense of this country's brilliant and brutal history, so no one ever thinks they can walk onto a stage one evening and laugh at another's too often painful past".

On January 7, 2016, Australian cartoonist Chris Roy Taylor published a cartoon of Jamaican cricketer Chris Gayle with a whole watermelon in his mouth. Gayle had been in the news for making controversial suggestive comments towards a female interviewer during a live broadcast. The cartoon depicted a Cricket Australia official asking a boy if he could "borrow" the watermelon, so Gayle would be unable to speak. A couple of days earlier, a video of a boy eating a whole watermelon – rind and all – in the stands of a cricket match had gone viral. Taylor said he was unaware of the stereotype, and the cartoon was removed.

On October 22, 2017, a segment from the Fox & Friends morning show on the Fox News channel dressed a boy of Latino descent, who was mistaken by many as an African American, in a watermelon Halloween costume, drawing ire on social media.

During Donald Trump's 2024 presidential election rally at Madison Square Garden, comedian Tony Hinchcliffe made a joke involving black people carving watermelons for Halloween.

== Gallery ==
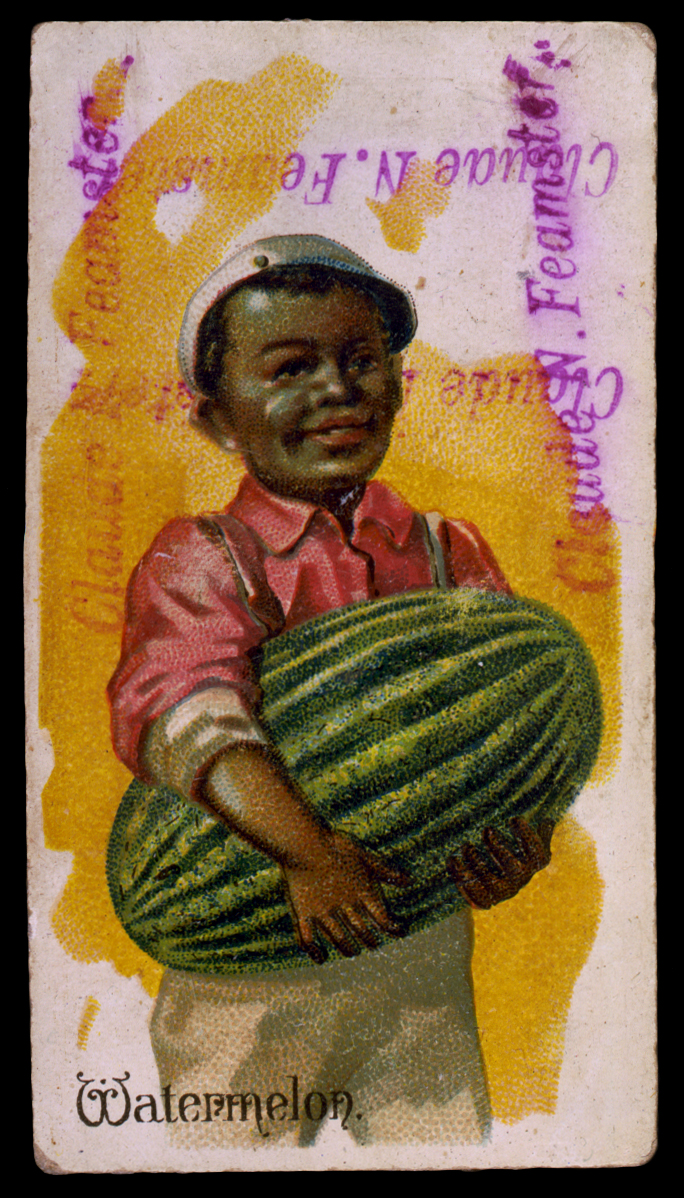
Lithograph of a Black boy holding a watermelon, c. 1850–1900

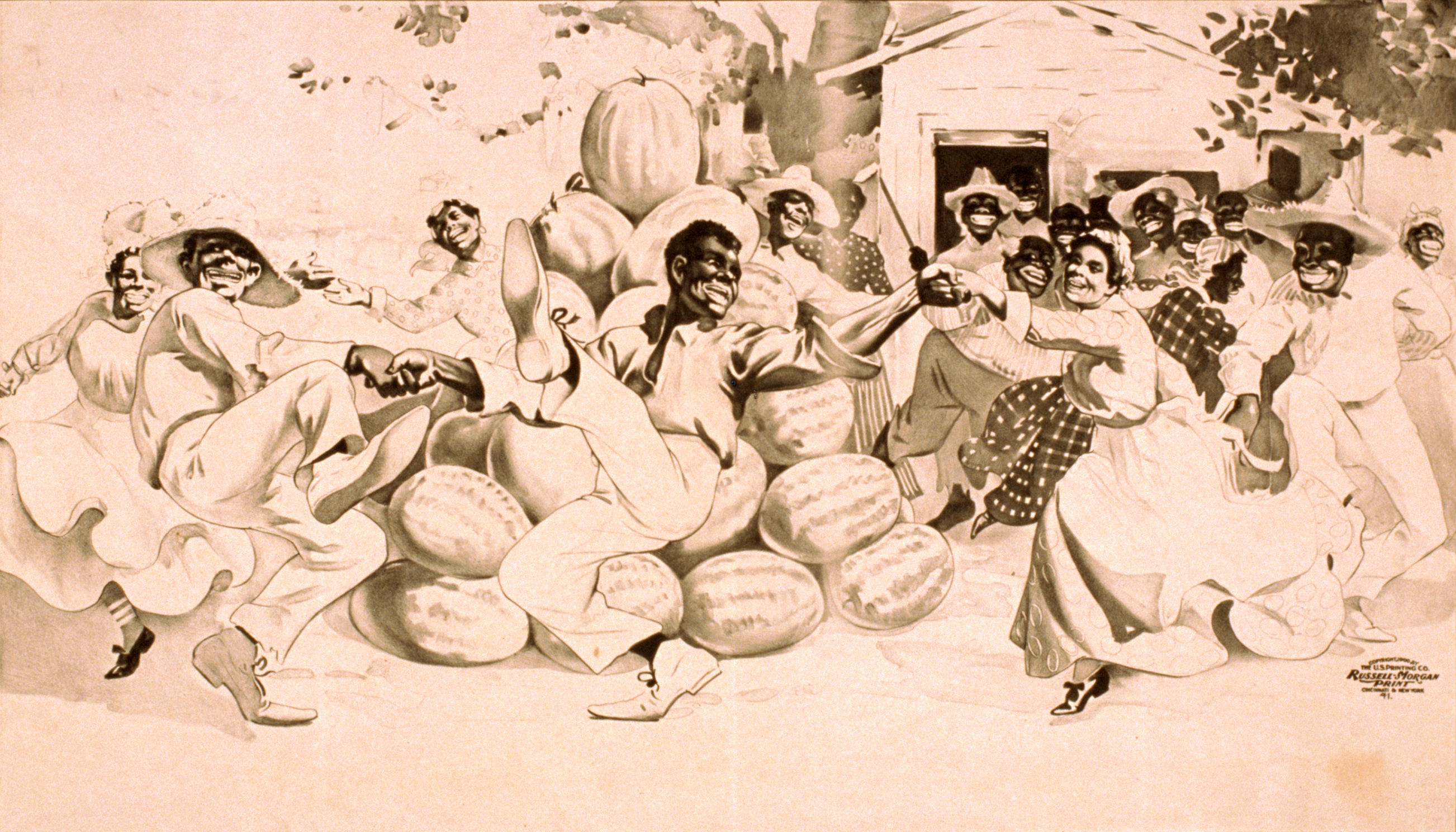
Lithograph of Black people dancing around a pile of watermelons, c. 1900

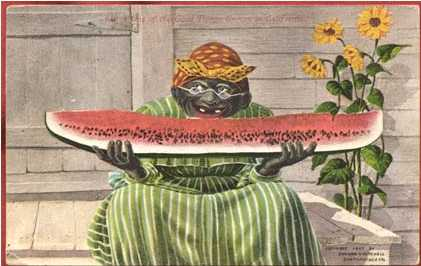
Postcard ("Coon card") from the 1900s

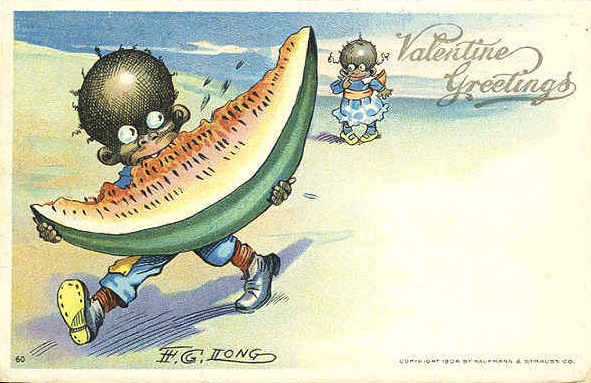
"Coon card" from 1904

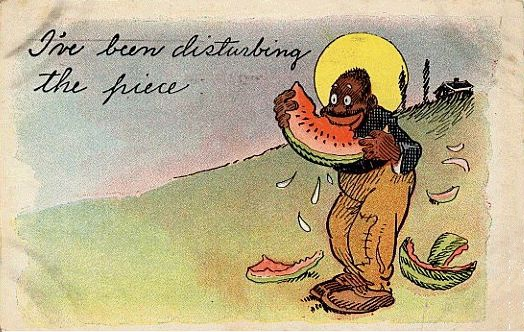
"Coon card" from 1910

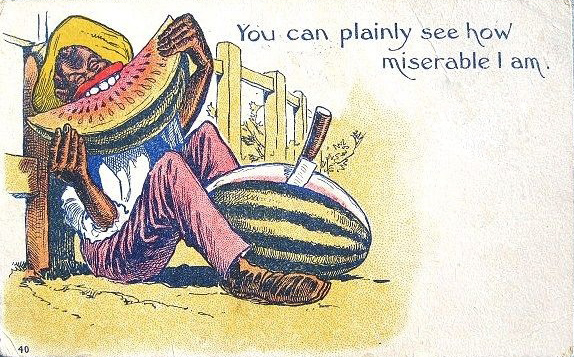
"Coon card" from 1911, with the title "You can plainly see how miserable I am"

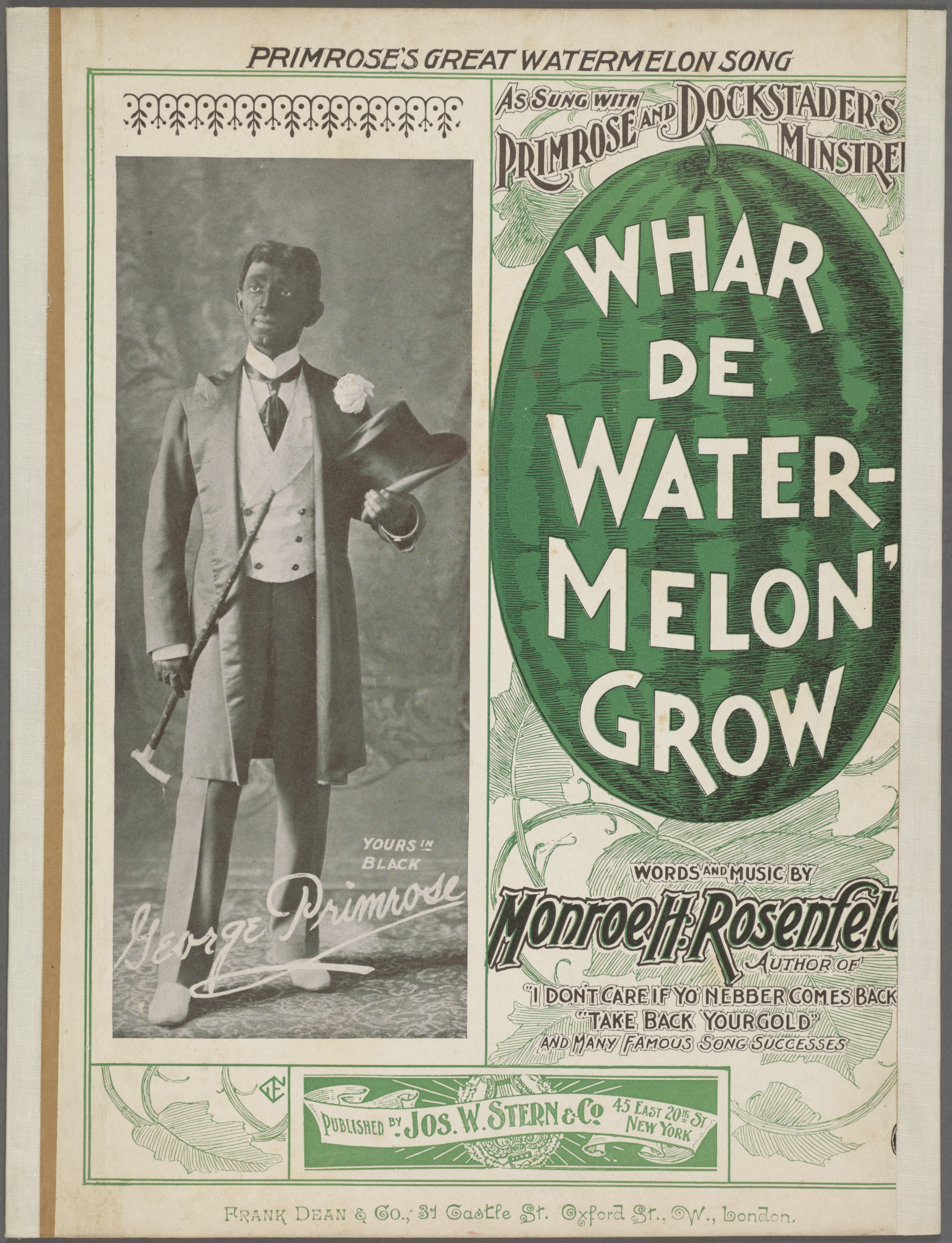
"Whar De Watermelon Grow", sheet music of an 1898 minstrel song

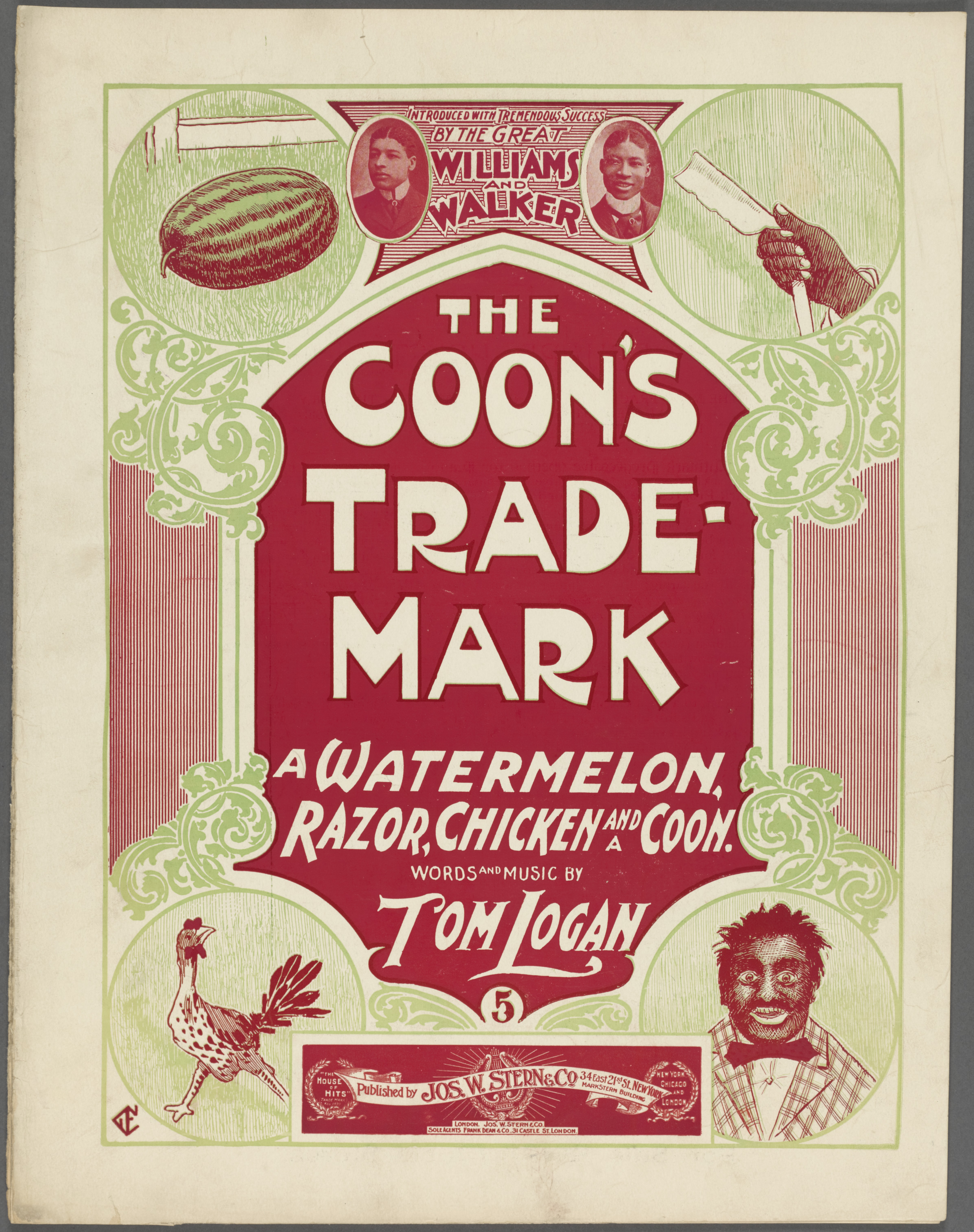
"The Coon's Trade-mark: A Watermelon, Razor, Chicken and Coon", sheet music of an 1898 minstrel song. The razor was used for fighting, while fried chicken is also used in stereotypes of African Americans.

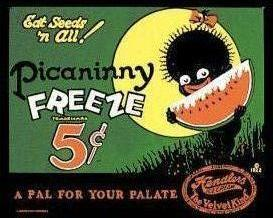
Reproduction of an old tin sign advertising Picaninny Freeze, a frozen treat. It was later adapted for the theatrical poster and original DVD cover of Spike Lee's 2000 film Bamboozled.

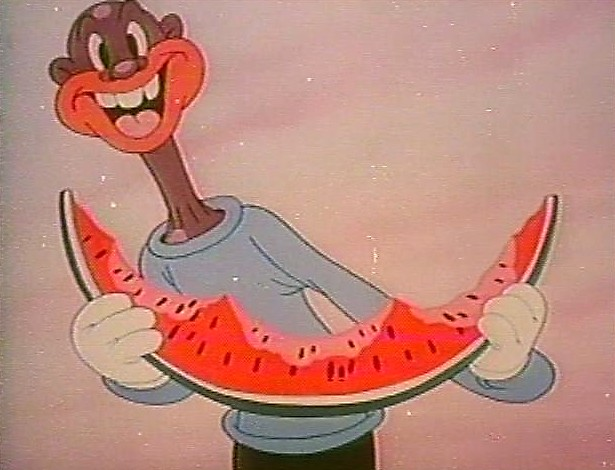
A character from the 1941 cartoon Scrub Me Mama with a Boogie Beat enjoying a watermelon.

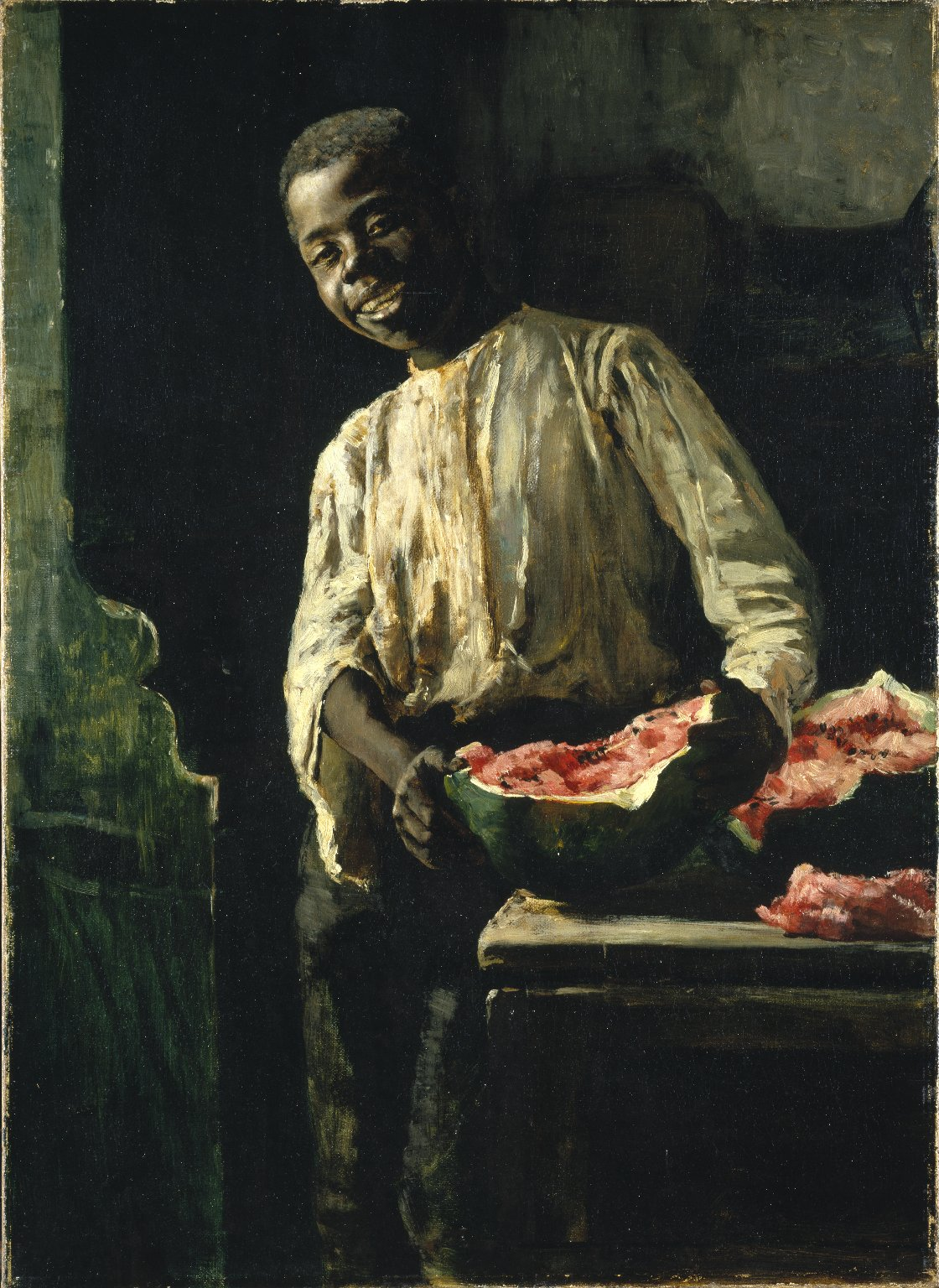
I Know'd It Was Ripe, c. 1888 by Thomas Hovenden Brooklyn Museum

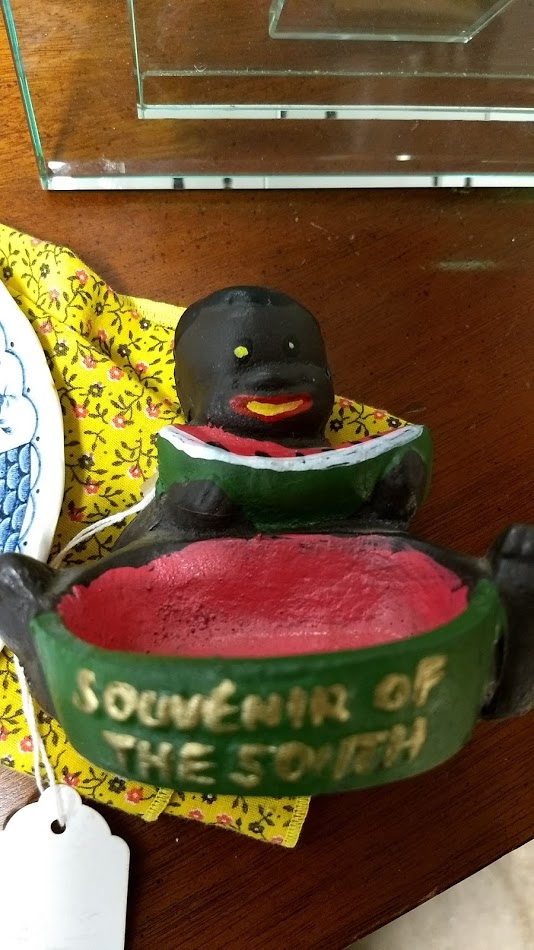

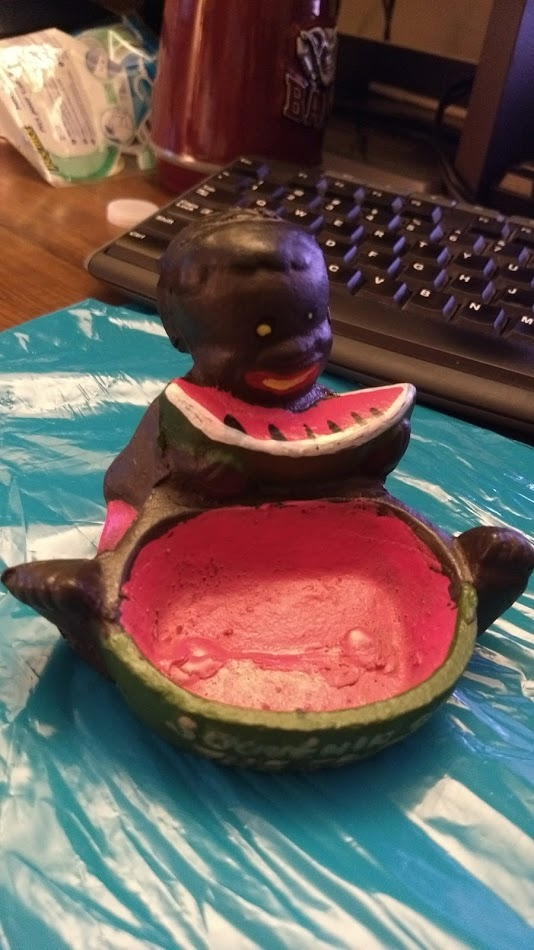

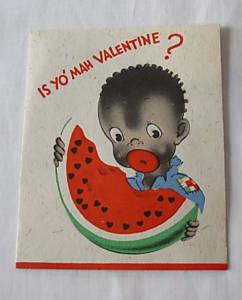
Valentine's Day card, c. 1940

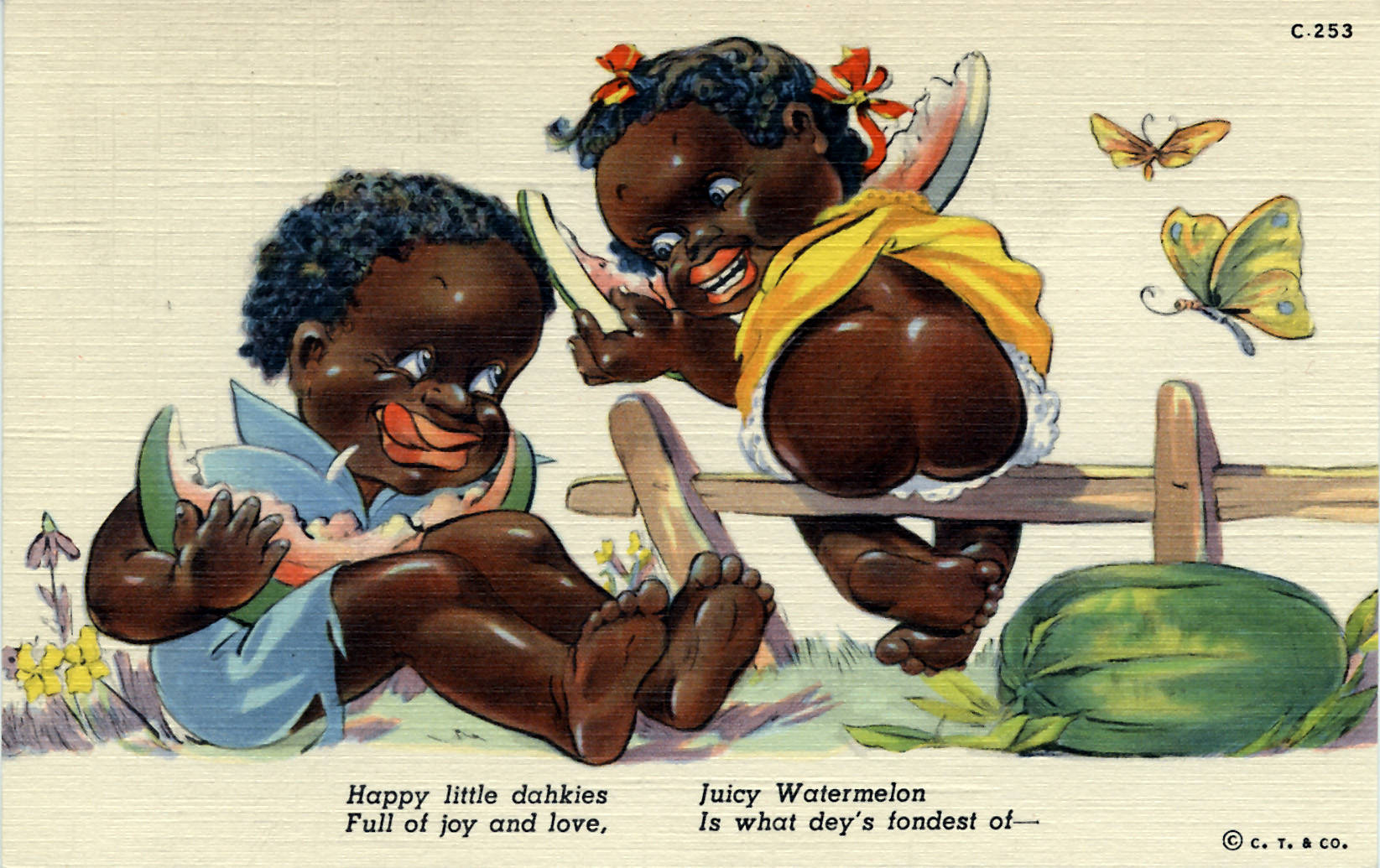

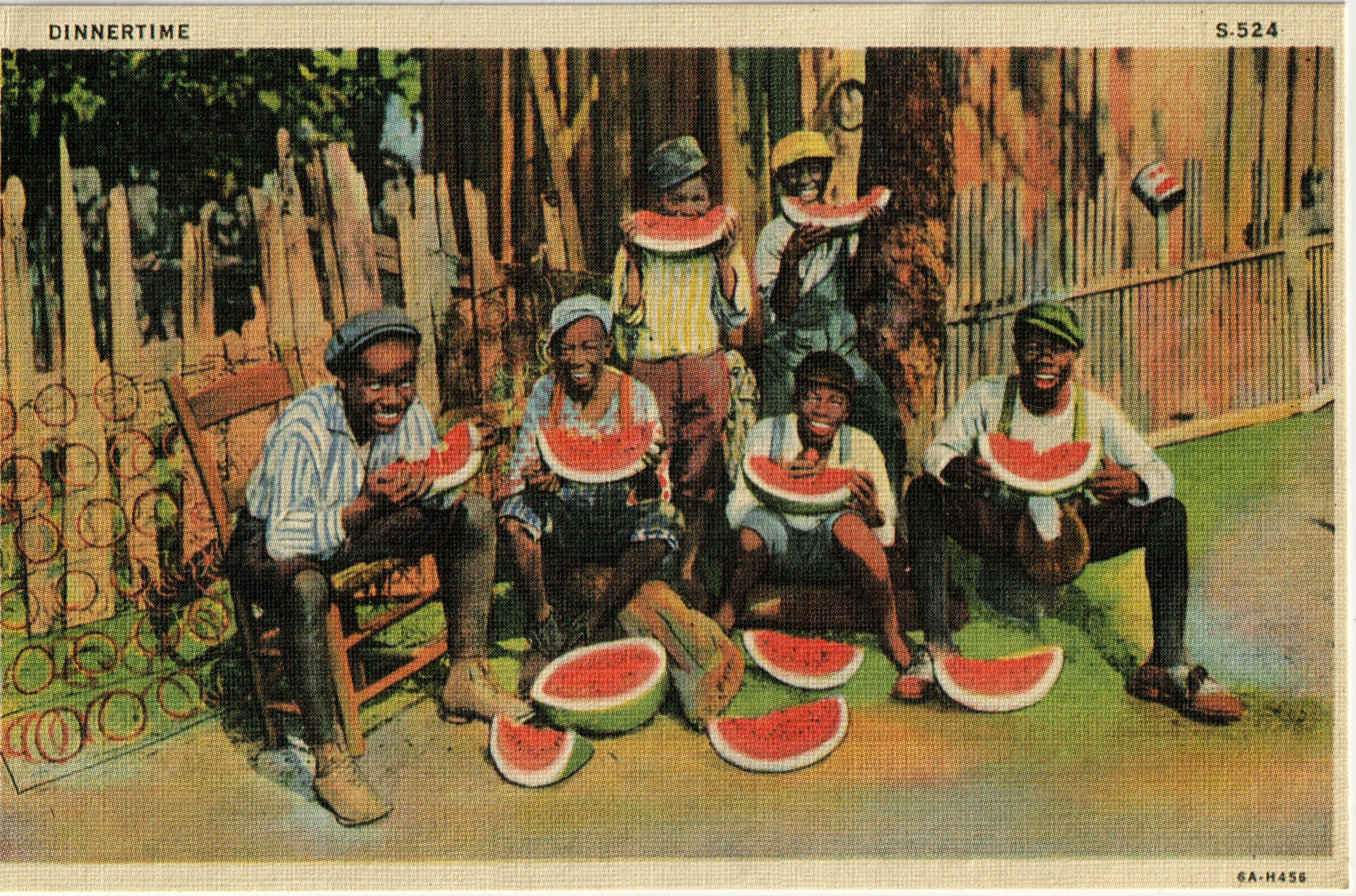
"Dinnertime" -- postcard of watermelons being eaten

== See also ==
- Fried chicken stereotype
- Coon Chicken Inn
- Golliwog
- Kherson watermelon – Symbol of Ukrainian resistance
