= Coon card =

Postcards with anti-black racist imagery

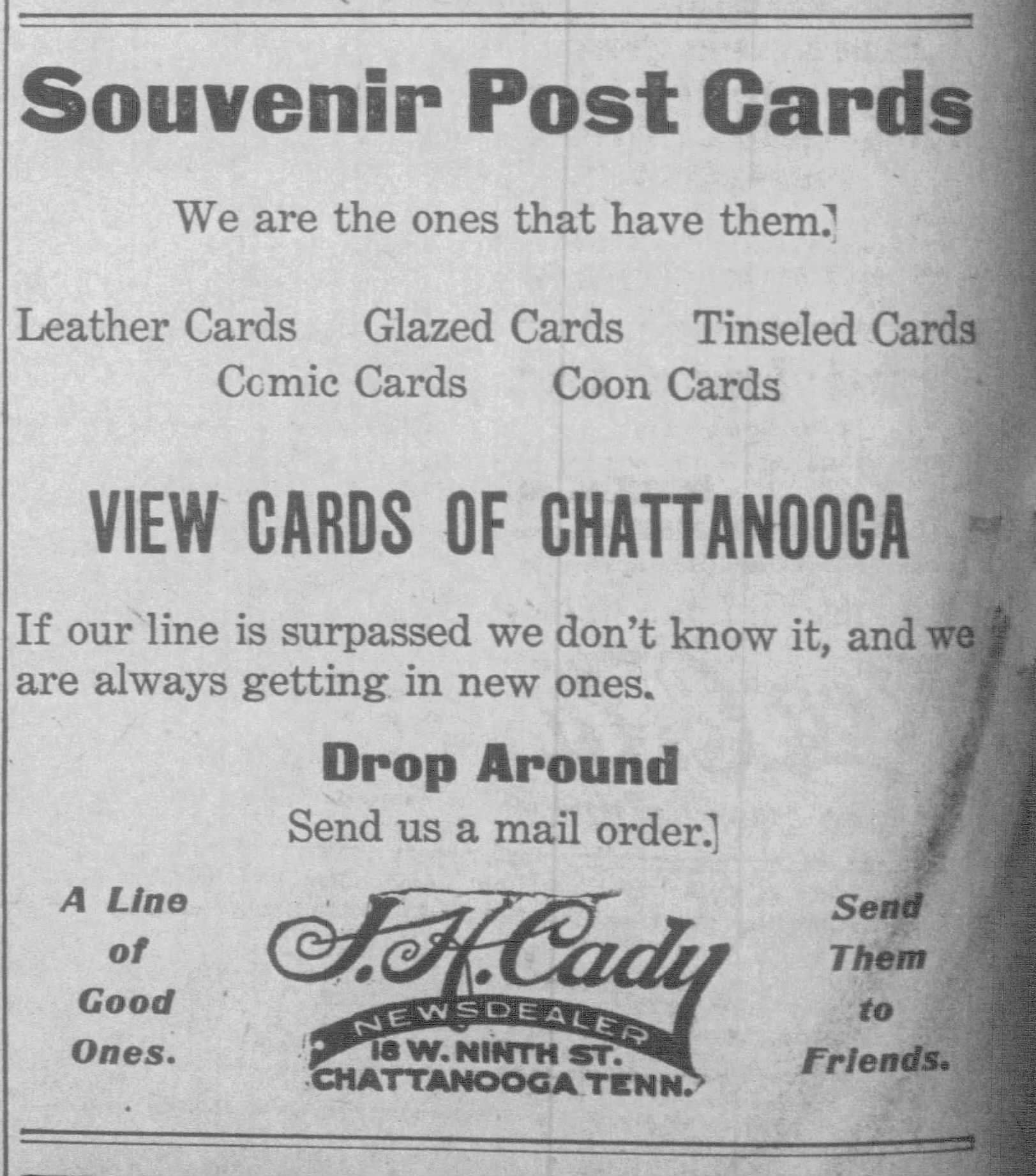
Tennessee news dealer lists coon cards for sale (Chattanooga Daily Times, 1905)

Coon cards were anti-Black, racist picture postcards and greeting cards sold in the United States in the 19th and 20th centuries. Coon was short for raccoon, an American mammal; coon was a commonly used derogatory term for African Americans.

Especially after the turn-of-the-century, "the postcard was wildly successful both as correspondence and collectible" and thus postcards are valuable sources for cultural historians as both a form of epistolary literature and for the bank of cultural imagery included in the postcard illustrations reflecting historic popular culture norms and tropes. Coon cards were produced by white manufacturers for white customers and depicted an array of African Americans stereotypes common to the popular media of the day. The caricature was part of the popular appeal of the postcards as "image content was clearly driven by free market forces, rather than the intention to present an accurate depiction of people, places, or things." For example, children were typically depicted as pickaninnies eating watermelon or being used as alligator bait. African American adults were depicted as intellectually and morally inferior to whites and were associated with cakewalking, fried chicken, watermelon, cotton, lack of conscientiousness, laziness, ribaldry, sexual promiscuity, domestic violence, gambling, alcoholism, cannibalism, and farts.

Coon cards—which were representative of general racial attitudes of the era and conveyed and perpetuated ideas about "appearance, behavior, and overall identity"—depict Black people as "subhuman, ape-like beasts." African Americans were depicted with "protruding jaws and chins" that aligned their low status in a pseudoscientific racial hierarchy outlined by Pieter Camper, et al. Bug eyes, pigeon toes, elongated limbs, and enlarged extremities contributed to the "simianizing" of Black people in postcard images of the coon card era.

These images benefited whites as well as harming Black people by promoting a sense of in-group solidarity among whites and social superiority to an "othered" out-group. Coon cards were used by whites to send routine "holiday greetings, exchanges of neighborhood gossip, expressions of concern for bed-ridden loved ones, and declarations of familial and romantic love."

Coon cards are now considered collectible ephemera and a useful tool for studying the history of racism in the United States. Coon cards are distinct from, but related to, the equally collectible genre of Black postcards, which are postcards produced by and for the African-American community.

== Additional images ==
Racist postcards
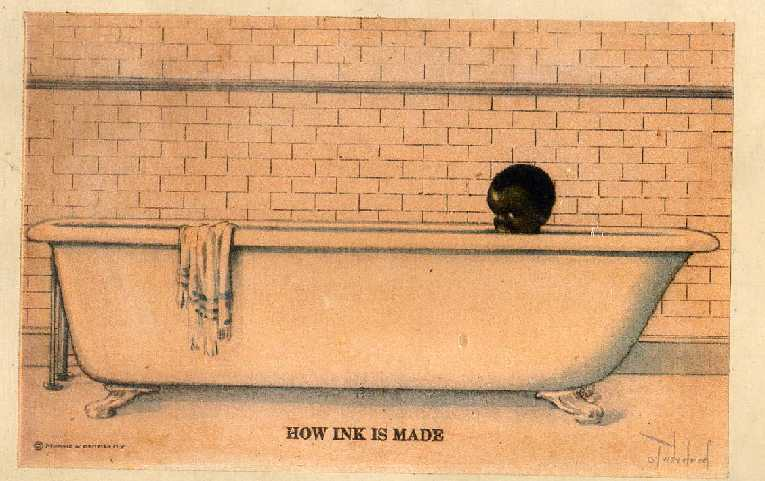
"How Ink Is Made" postcard, published c. 1900

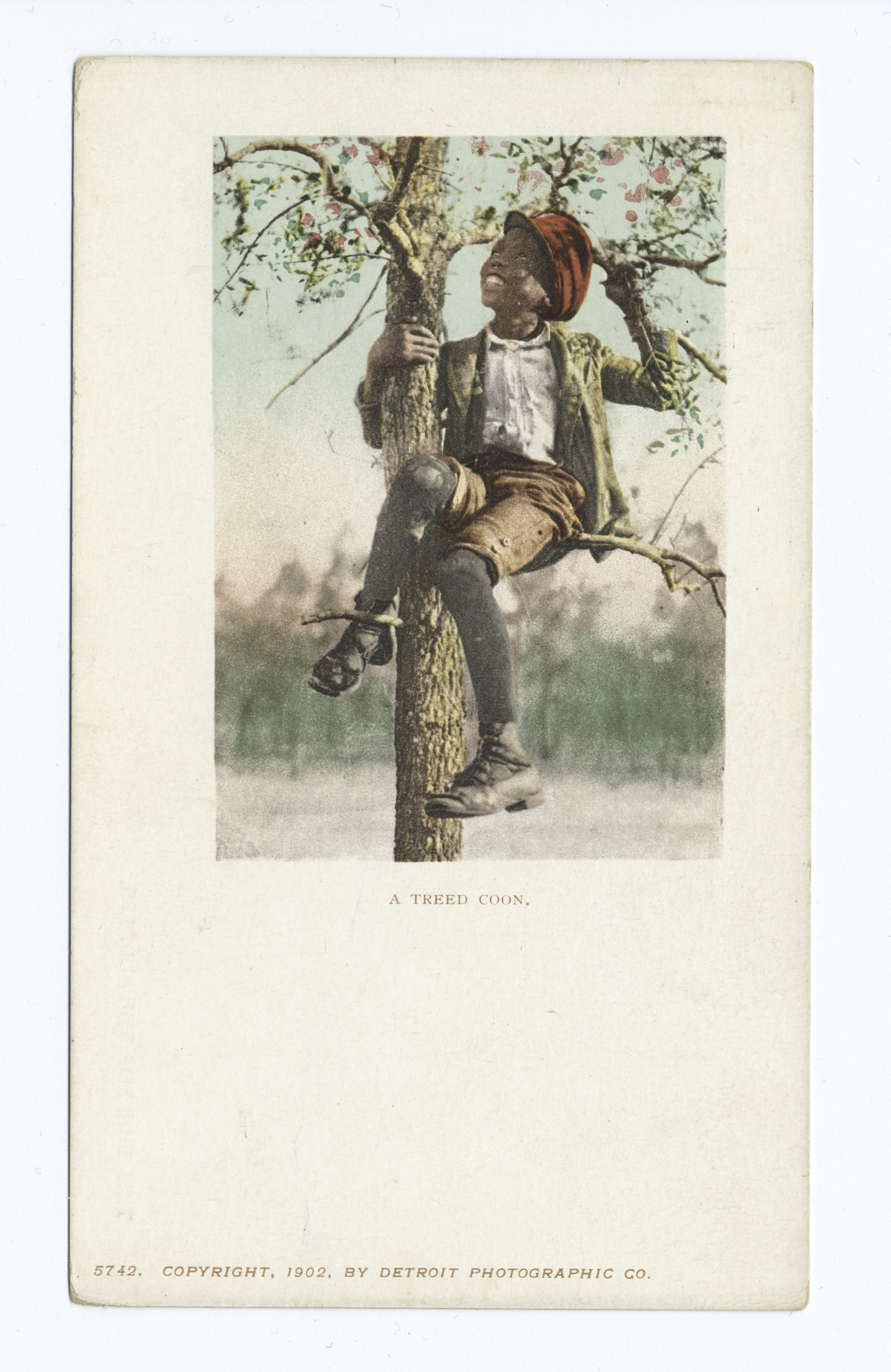
"A Treed Coon" postcard, published c. 1900 by Detroit Pub. Co. (NYPL Collection)

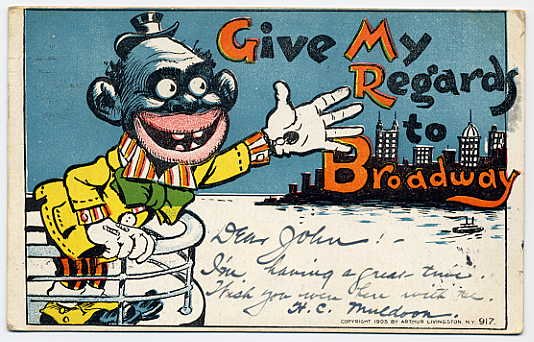
Sent from New York City

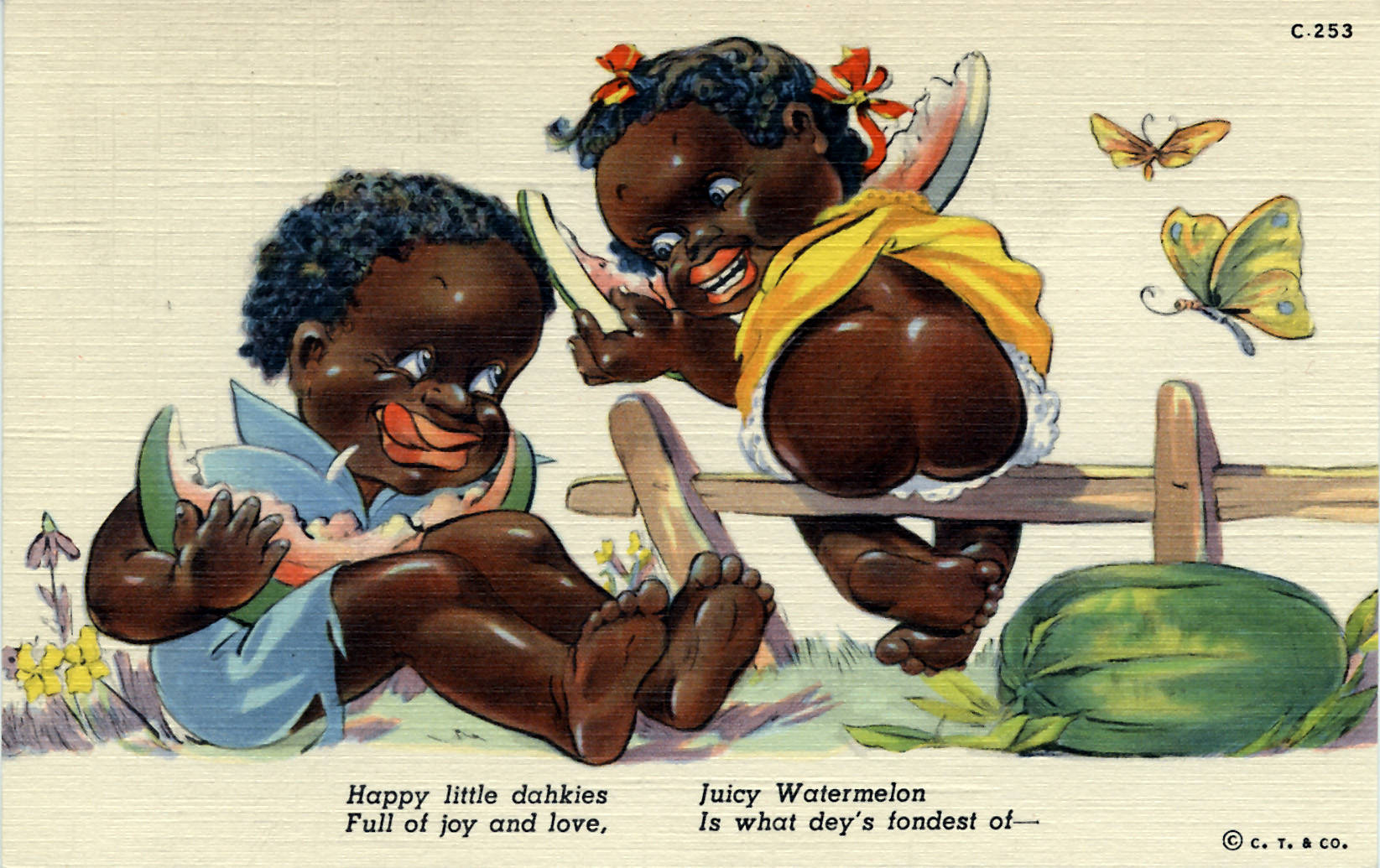
"Happy little Dahkies" (NBY 8333)

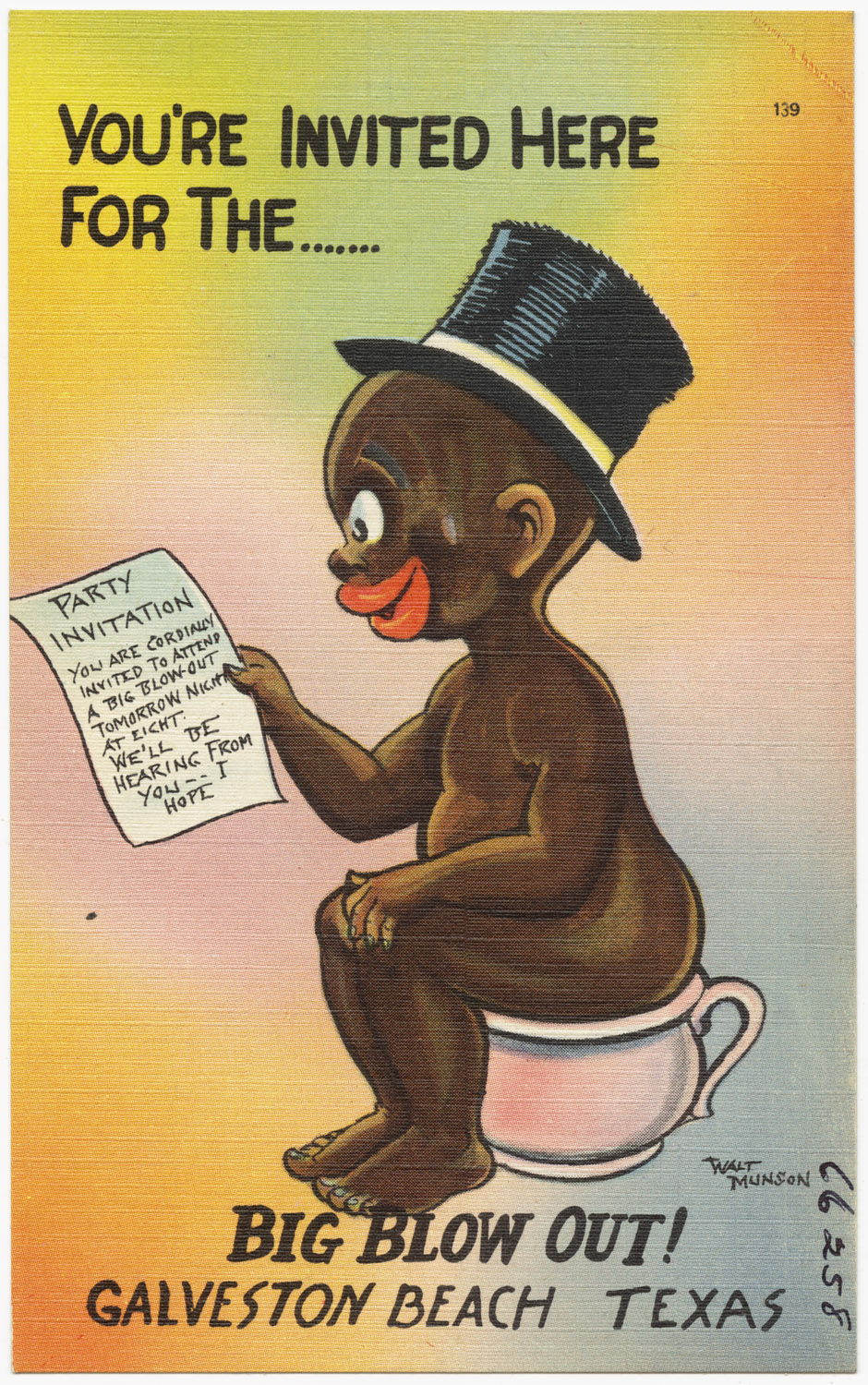
You're invited here for the...Big blow out!, Galveston Beach, Texas

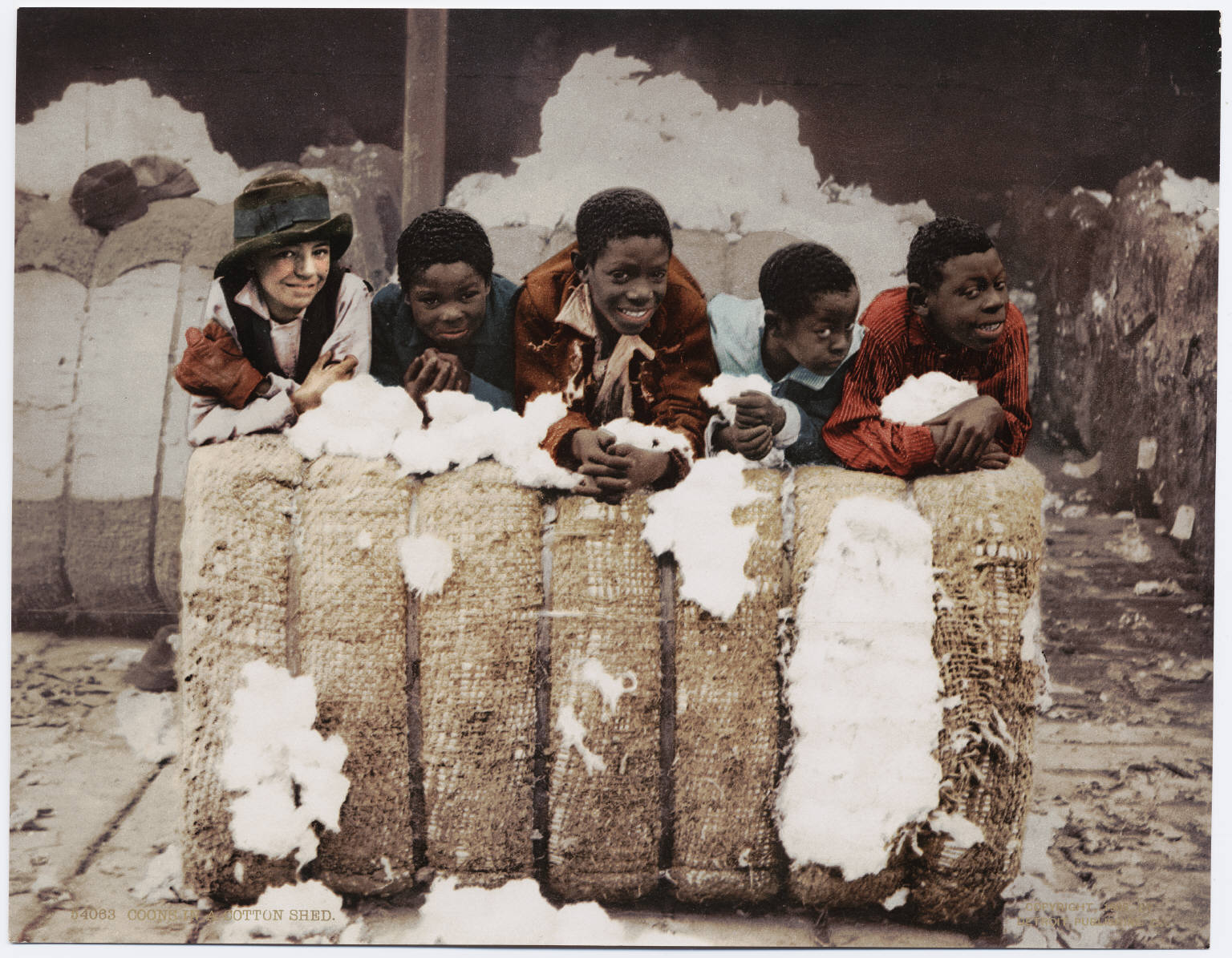
"Coons in a Cotton Shed" photochrom postcard published by the Detroit Photographic Company, circa 1897–1924

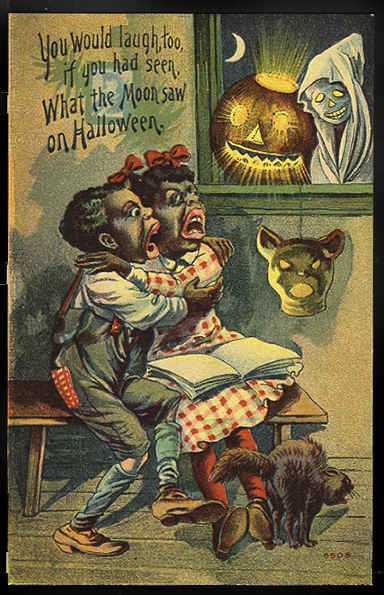
"You would laugh too, if you had seen, What the Moon saw on Halloween." Fold-out Halloween card, early 1900s, United States. (Black Americana at Howard Bernard Collectibles)

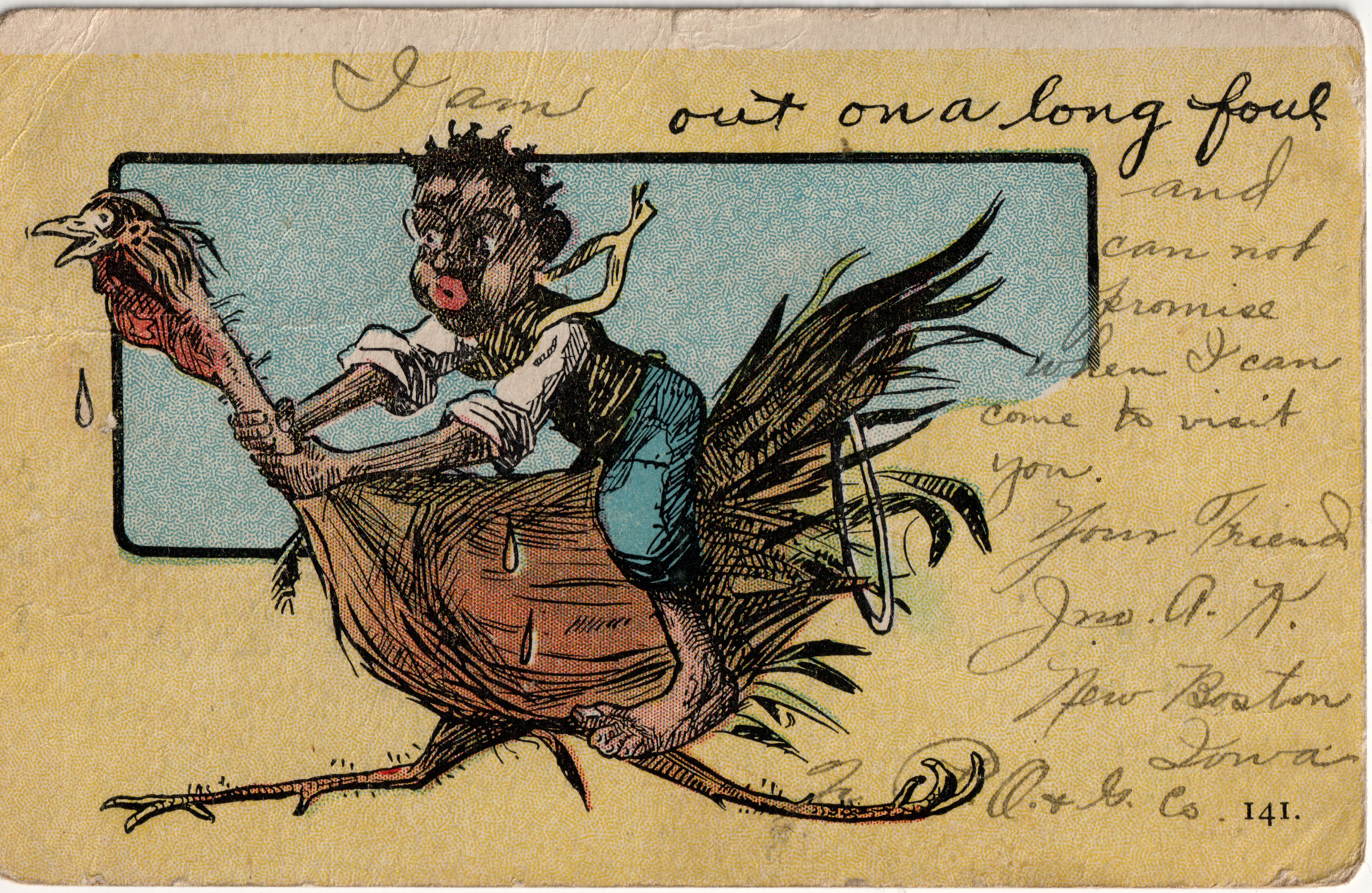
Racial stereotype postcard "out on a long foul"—man riding a chicken, about 1907

== See also ==
- History of postcards in the United States
- Coon song
- Ethnic stereotypes in comics
- Lynching postcard
- Stereotypes of African Americans
- Nadir of American race relations
