= A Grandchild's Guide to Using Grandpa's Computer =

1994 poem by Gene Ziegler

- by Gene Ziegler
- Written: 1994
- Country: United States
- Language: English
- Genre: Humor
- Publisher: NetGuide
- Publication date: March 1995

"A Grandchild's Guide to Using Grandpa's Computer" is a humorous poem composed by Gene Ziegler in 1994. It was widely plagiarized on the internet and in print under the title "If Dr. Seuss Were a Technical Writer".

== Composition ==
In 1994, Gene Ziegler, then a professor at Cornell University, faced a calamity when his young grandson and the boy's older brother "significantly rearranged" the resources on his Macintosh computer. He composed "A Grandchild's Guide to Using Grandpa's Computer" in an hour that evening.

If a packet hits a pocket on a socket on a port,
And the bus is interrupted as a very last resort,
And the address of the memory makes your floppy disk abort
Then the socket packet pocket has an error to report!

== Publication history ==
Ziegler has stated that he wrote the poem for his internet friends and it was disseminated through emails, newsgroups and websites, quickly going viral in several countries. It was first published in NetGuide magazine in March 1995 and in the Seattle Times later that year, and has generated more than a thousand requests to be reproduced.

Early in the poem's history, an unidentified person edited the poem, halving its size, and spread it under the title "If Dr. Seuss Were a Technical Writer" attributed to "Anonymous". Ziegler wrote to numerous webmasters to remove the plagiarized version but soon abandoned this as it was spreading faster than he could hope to deal with it. Instead, he responded with the 26-line poem "Hang the Information Highwayman!" as a general appeal to respect the works of others. The plagiarized version of the poem, erroneously believed to be in the public domain, has been widely reproduced in humour and technical publications, such as the July 1995 issue of Network World.

Ziegler's version has been used by teachers, journalists, and speech therapists, and is often cited in discussions of internet publishing ethics. It was twice set to music – once by a rapper, and once in a Gilbert and Sullivan style by a music teacher – and part of it is recited in the closing credits of Canadian TV show Dotto's Data Café.
