= Halloween card =

Greeting card genre (~1890-~1910)

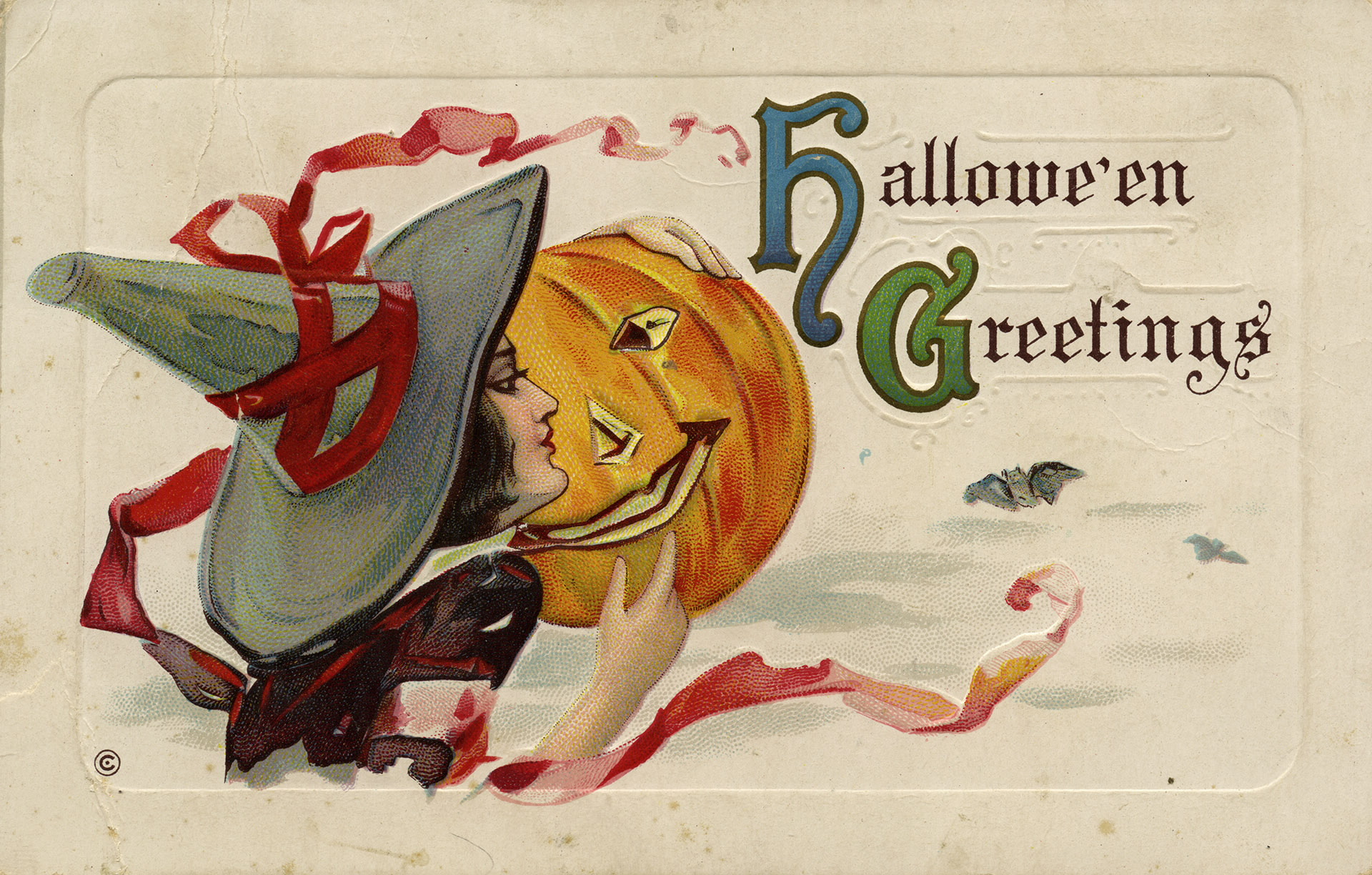
An early 1900s Halloween post card depicting a woman dressed as a witch with a Jack-o'-lantern, captioned as "Hallowe'en Greetings"

A Halloween card is a greeting card associated with Halloween. The concept originated in the 1890s United States, experiencing a peak of popularity there in the early 1900s. Until the advent of the common home telephone, Halloween cards occupied a role similar to Christmas cards and birthday cards. Today, many cards from the popular designers of the period are sought after as memorabilia.

== History ==
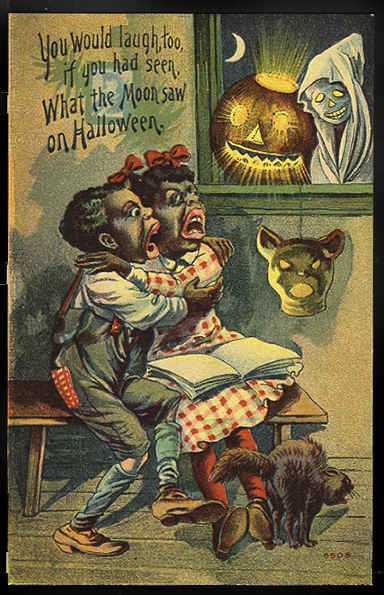
Early 20th century coon card featuring racist caricatures of black children

An early reference to a Halloween card is made in volume 4 of Ingall's Home and Art Magazine published in 1891, in which a sample design is depicted in the article Domestic Helps for the Home by Laura Willis Lathrop. Early Halloween cards typically depicted the same themes as Easter cards and Christmas cards, as publishers reused images for various holidays, with the caption signifying the specific holiday. From about 1900 to 1915, the United States experienced a Halloween "postcard craze" that continued the commercialization of the holiday that began in the 1800s. By 1909, the Souvenir Post Card Company of New York City produced 12 Halloween card designs. (Note: By comparison, that year it produced 206 Christmas cards, 144 Easter cards, 70 Valentine's Day cards, 56 New Year's cards, and 36 Thanksgiving Day cards, as well as cards for other holidays including birthdays, St. Patrick's Day, George Washington and Abraham Lincoln's birthdays, and Decoration Day.)

The popularity of Halloween cards rivaled that of Christmas cards until about 1930, by which time telephones were common household items and began supplanting the use of greeting cards. Halloween-themed postal cards were sold in post offices and by private printers with displays in general stores. Their popularity and the holiday's commercial success was "ultimately determined" by women, particularly those in the middle class.

Of the over 3,000 cards produced in the United States during this period, many depicted themes common to the modern tradition, including witches, pumpkins, and goblins. Other Halloween postcard themes included fortune-telling and romance or courtship. Designs also reflected the racism in the United States of the era: of the postcards produced by the Rust Craft Greeting Card Company from 1927 to 1959 catalogued by Wendy Morris, twelve categories of ethnic imagery were identified. The most common theme being black children, appearing on 42% of cards depicting an ethnic or racial difference from the white majority.

== Designers ==
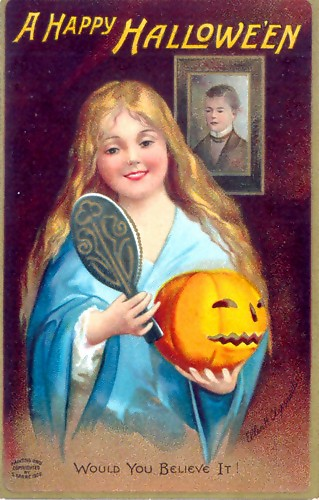
A 1904 postcard designed by Ellen Clapsaddle

Well-known early postcard printers include Winsch and Raphael Tuck & Sons. Both printers employed artists whose postcard designs are collectables sought by Halloween memorabilia collectors. Winsch works by Samuel Schmucker (described as "small masterpieces of art nouveau" by Lisa Morton in her book The Halloween Encyclopedia) and Jason Freixas are highly prized. Among the artists employed by Tuck were Francis Brundage, and the "queen of postcard artists", Ellen Clapsaddle.

== Sources ==
- Andrews, Barbara (2012). Postcard Collector. Krause Publications. ISBN 9781440234989.
- Lathrop, Laura Willis (1891). "Domestic Helps for the Home". Ingall's Home and Art Magazine. Vol. 4. J.F. Ingalls.
- Morton, Lisa (2003). The Halloween Encyclopedia. McFarland & Company. ISBN 978-0-7864-6074-8.
- Shank, Barry (2004). A token of my affection: greeting cards and American business culture. Columbia University Press. ISBN 0231118791.
- Williams, Rebecca J. (2 May 2017). Weird old figures and a new twist: Cultural functions of Halloween at the turn of the 20th century (Thesis). Virginia Polytechnic Institute and State University. hdl:10919/78010.
