= Fried chicken stereotype =

Anti-African American racist trope

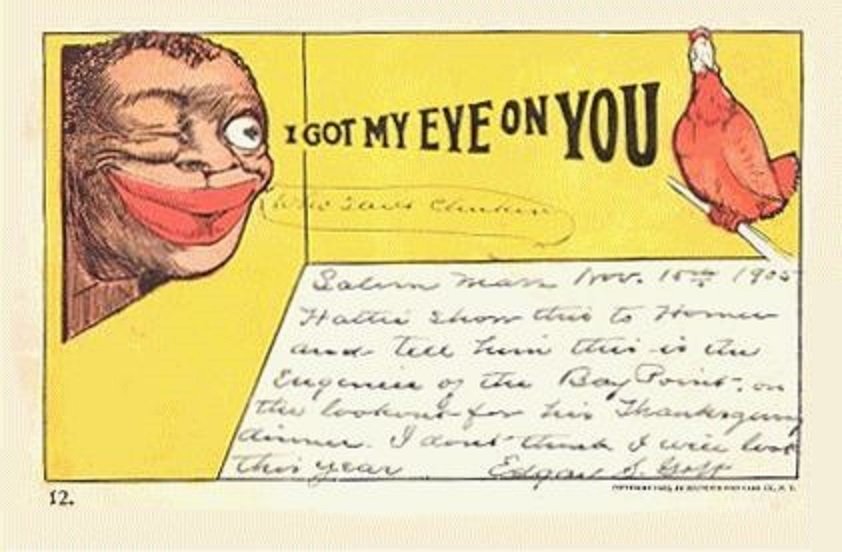
"Coon card" from 1905

The fried chicken stereotype is an anti-African American racist trope that has its roots in the American Civil War and traditional slave foods. The popularity of fried chicken in the Southern United States and its portrayal in films like The Birth of a Nation contributed to the development of this stereotype, and restaurant brands such as Coon Chicken Inn further commercialized it. Though fried chicken is now also celebrated as soul food, its association with African American culture is sometimes considered a sensitive issue. Public figures like Tiger Woods have been targeted with fried chicken-related remarks, and organizations have been criticized for serving it during Black History Month or making racially insensitive references.

== History ==
Since the American Civil War, traditional slave foods like Southern fried chicken, watermelon, and chitterlings have suffered a strong association with stereotypes of African Americans and blackface minstrelsy. The reasons for this are various. Chicken dishes were popular among enslaved people before the American Civil War, as chickens were generally the only animals enslaved people were allowed to own, as well as being cheap and easy to raise.

The notion of African Americans having a special affinity for fried chicken has its origins in both the popularity of chicken in the cuisine of the Southern United States as well as the 1915 silent film The Birth of a Nation, in which a rowdy African American man is seen eating fried chicken in a legislative hall. The stereotype was commercialized in the 20th century by restaurants such as Coon Chicken Inn, which selected exaggerated depictions of Black people as mascots, implying quality by their association with the stereotype.

Although also being acknowledged positively as "soul food" today, the affinity that African American culture has for fried chicken has been considered by some to be a delicate, often pejorative issue. Melissa Thompson, a British food columnist, has expressed her reluctance to admit her love of fried chicken as a Black British woman, due to the stereotype associated with fried chicken in American culture.

== Uses ==
On two occasions, the golfer Tiger Woods has been the target of remarks regarding fried chicken. After Woods became the youngest Masters Tournament champion in 1997, golfer Fuzzy Zoeller said Woods should avoid serving fried chicken "or collard greens or whatever the hell they serve" at the Champions' Dinner the following year. Similarly, golfer Sergio García joked in 2013, "we'll have [Woods] 'round for dinner every night. We will serve fried chicken" when asked if he would invite Woods to his house. Woods said Garcia's remark was "wrong, hurtful and clearly inappropriate". Both Zoeller and García later apologized to Woods.

Various groups and organizations have been criticized for serving fried chicken during Black History Month, making references to "Obama Fried Chicken" and other racial stereotypes associated with the food.

== See also ==
- Coon card
- Coon Chicken Inn
- Grape drink
- Stereotypes of African Americans
- Watermelon stereotype
