= Unwins =

Alcohol beverage is in Kent

Unwins was a chain of 381 off-licences selling alcoholic beverages based in Kent, England, with outlets focused on London and the South East. Unwins was founded in 1843, and became insolvent on 19 December 2005. 200 of the former Unwin stores were subsequently sold to rival Thresher Group.

== History ==
Unwins was founded as a family-owned and run business in 1843, in Kent. It remained in family ownership until March 2005, when it was sold to private equity firm DM for £32 million. With Unwins being based primarily in London and the south-east of England, the fate of its fortunes suffered from its restrictive geography. With the advent of the 'booze cruise' cut-price cross-channel ferries (along with, to a lesser extent, LeShuttle operating through the Channel Tunnel) allowing Unwins' target market ready access to a vast array of high quality, and popular brands of French wines along with beers and spirits – all by the case loads, at rock-bottom cash-and-carry prices – this put an untenable strain on both the business model, and their long-term future profitability.

On 19 December 2005, Unwins collapsed and went into insolvency, with, at the time, the closure of 381 stores and the loss of 1,800 Unwins staff jobs. Accountancy firm KPMG were appointed as joint administrators, and they were able to sell 200 former Unwins stores to rival firm and First Quench Retailing-owned Thresher Group, and intended saving 1,200 former jobs. It was reported that the ultimate downfall of Unwins was due to its failure to adapt and evolve its offerings to the needs and requirements of the current market trends.

Thresher Group, which then already had around 2,000 UK stores, including Wine Rack, Victoria Wines and Bottoms Up – were to convert its 200 Unwins stores into the Threshers brand. Thresher Group having completed the integration of the Unwins stores into its South East England estate found itself in a similar situation to the company it had partially rescued and First Quench the holding company entered administration 29 October 2009. KPMG were appointed as joint administrators.
