= Pickaninny =

Pidgin term for child, also a racial slur

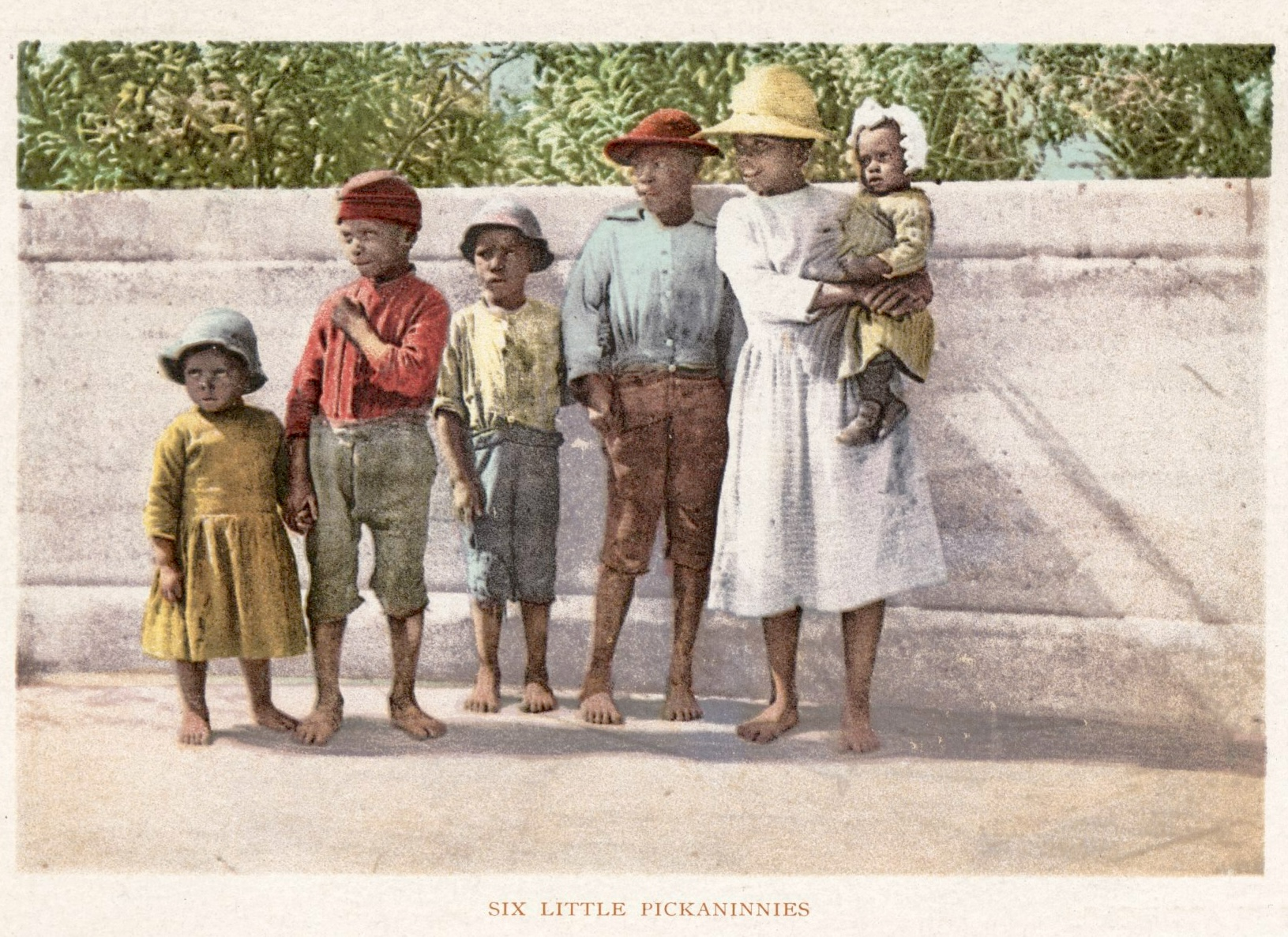
Postcard titled "Six Little Pickaninnies" (Detroit Publishing, 1902)

Pickaninny (also picaninny, piccaninny or pickininnie) is a racial slur for black children and a pejorative term for aboriginal children of the Americas, Australia, and New Zealand. The origins of the term are disputed. Along with several words for children in pidgin and creole languages, such as piccanin and pikinini, it may derive from the Portuguese pequenino ('boy, child, very small, tiny').

In the United States, the pickaninny is a derogatory caricature of a dark-skinned African-American child, often depicted with unkempt hair, bulging eyes, and large red lips. Such characters were a popular feature of minstrel shows into the twentieth century.

== Origins and usage ==
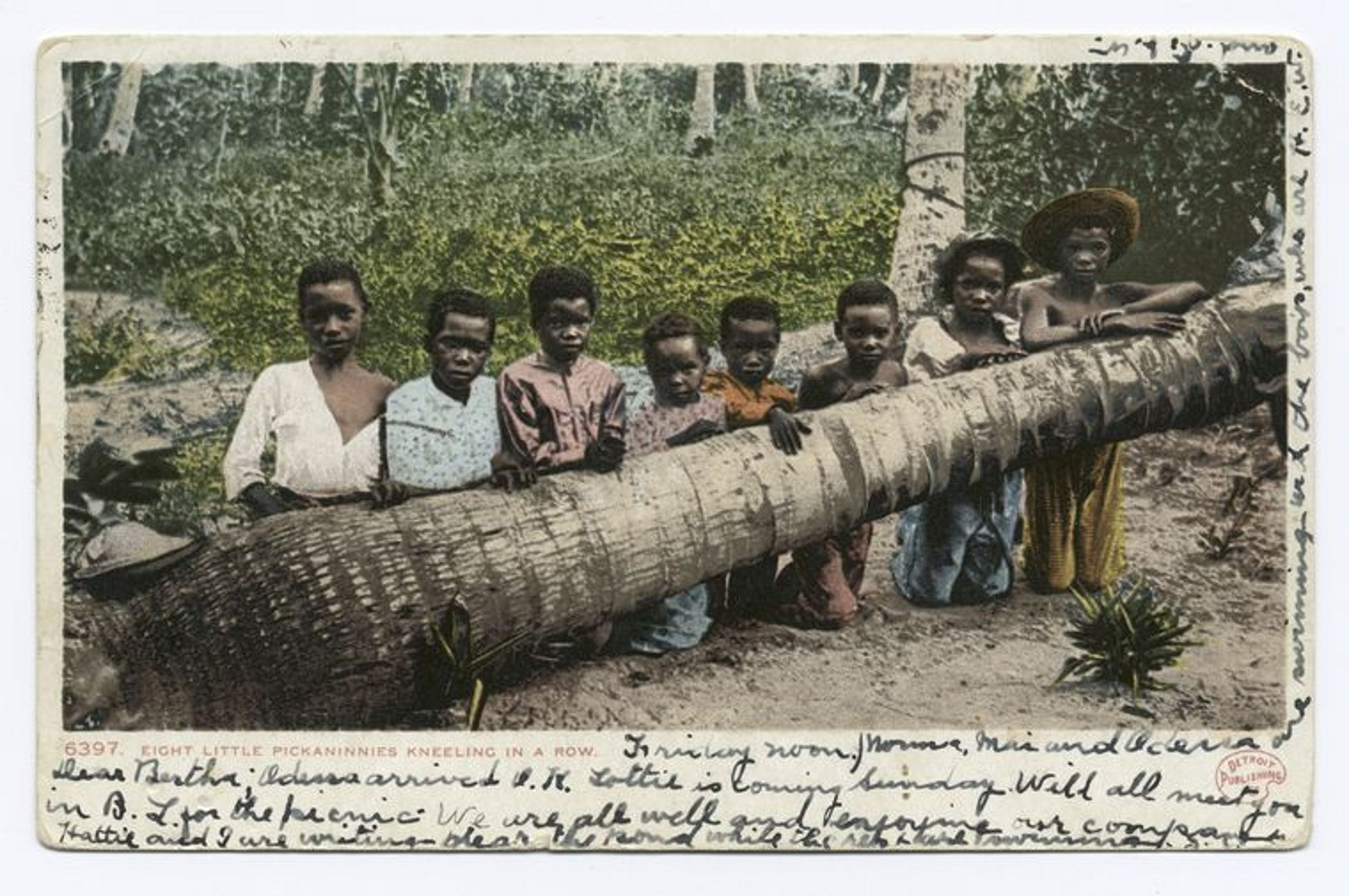
Postcard from Puerto Rico titled "Eight Little Pickaninnies Kneeling in a Row", 1902 or 1903

The origins of the word pickaninny (and its alternative spellings picaninny and piccaninny) are disputed; it may derive from the Portuguese term for a small child, pequenino. According to the Oxford English Dictionary, the term evidently spread through trade networks using Portuguese-based pidgins during the 17th century, especially the Atlantic slave trade. Other spellings include piccanini, pickoninnie, pick-ny, piccanin, and picannin.

Pickaninny was apparently used by slaves in the West Indies to affectionately refer to a child of any race. The term acquired a pejorative connotation by the nineteenth century as a term for black children in the United States, as well as aboriginal children of the Americas, Australia, and New Zealand. It is now generally considered offensive.

=== Similar terms in Pidgin and Creole languages ===
The term piccanin, derived from the Portuguese pequenino, has along with several variants become widely used in pidgin languages, meaning 'small'. This term is common in the creole languages of the Caribbean, especially those which are English-based. In Jamaican Patois, the word is found as pickney, which is used to describe a child regardless of racial origin. The same word is used in Antiguan and Barbudan Creole to mean "children", while in the English-based national creole language of Suriname, Sranang Tongo, pequeno has been borrowed as pikin for 'small' and 'child'.

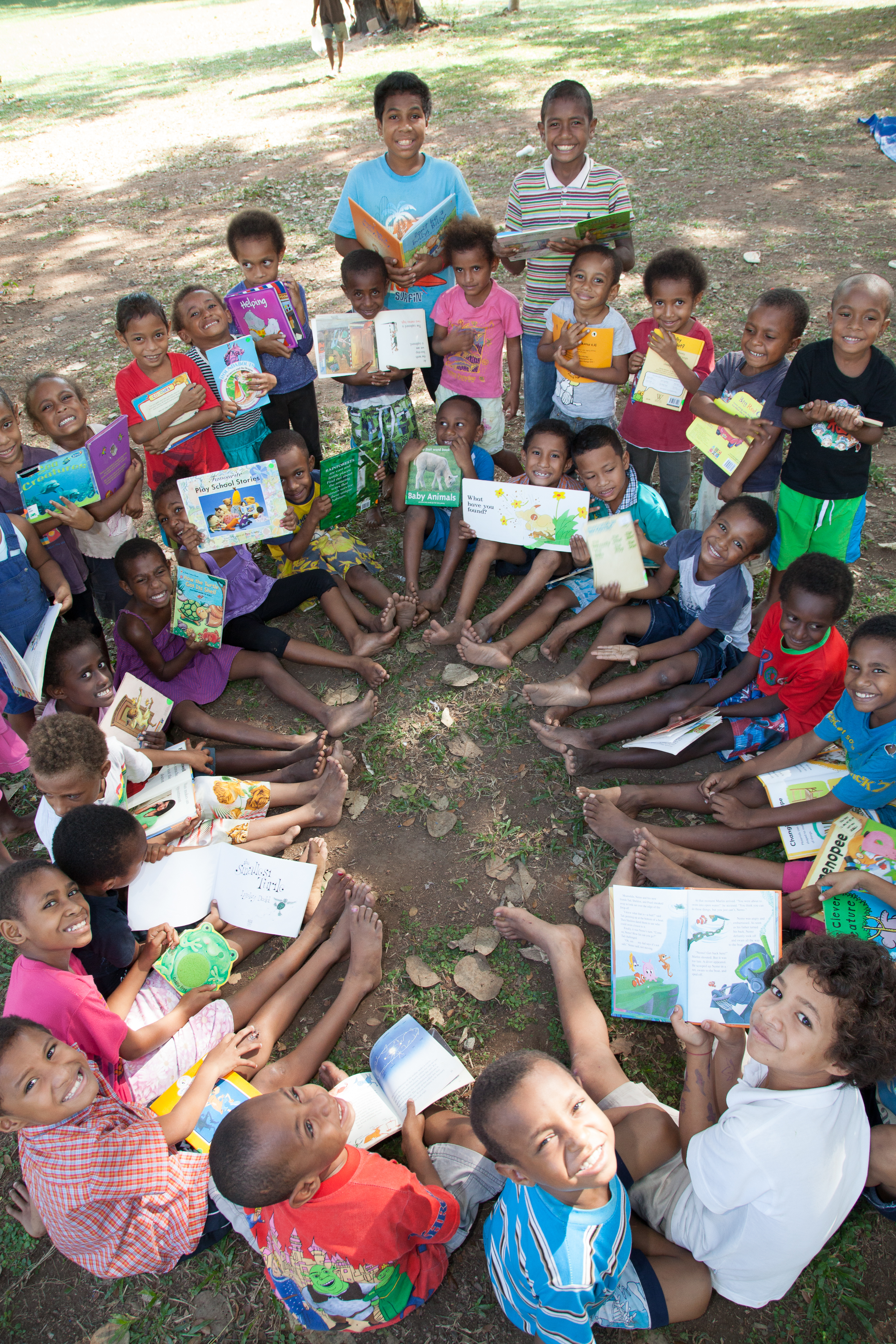
Local children at Buk bilong Pikinini ('Books for Children'), a nonprofit organization in Port Moresby, Papua New Guinea, 2013

The term pikinini is found in Melanesian pidgin and creole languages such as Tok Pisin of Papua New Guinea or Bislama of Vanuatu, as the usual word for 'child' (of a person or animal); it may refer to children of any race. Charles III used the term in a speech during a 2012 visit to Papua New Guinea. Speaking in Tok Pisin, Charles (then Prince of Wales) described himself as "nambawan pikinini bilong Misis Kwin" ('number one child belonging to Mrs. Queen').

In Nigerian as well as Cameroonian Pidgin English, the word pikin is used to mean a child. It can be heard in songs by African popular musicians such as Fela Kuti's Afrobeat song "Teacher Don't Teach Me Nonsense" and Prince Nico Mbarga's highlife song "Sweet Mother"; both are from Nigeria. In Sierra Leone Krio the term pikin refers to 'child' or 'children', while in Liberian English pekin does likewise. In Chilapalapa, a pidgin language used in Southern Africa, the term used is pikanin. In Sranan Tongo and Ndyuka of Suriname, pikin may refer to 'children' as well as to 'small' or 'little'. Some of these words may be more directly related to the Portuguese pequeno than to pequenino.

=== United States ===
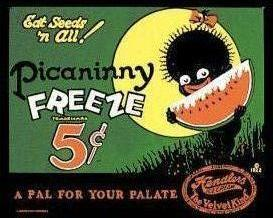
Reproduction of a 1922 advertisement for the frozen treat Picaninny Freeze, later used in the 2000 film Bamboozled

The first famous depiction of a pickaninny was the character of Topsy in Harriet Beecher Stowe's 1852 anti-slavery novel Uncle Tom's Cabin, presented as a neglected girl, poorly dressed and behaved, untamable and corrupted by slavery. The pickaninny became the dominant racial caricature of black children in the United States, and typically depicted untamed, genderless children with unkempt hair, bulging eyes, large mouths, and red lips, often stuffing their mouths with watermelon or fried chicken.

These characters were a popular feature of minstrel shows into the twentieth century. Black children were often depicted as being threatened or attacked by animals, and resistant or immune to pain. They were often seen on postcards and other ephemera being chased or eaten by alligators. Scholar of African-American literature Rebecca Wanzo argues that the pickaninny caricature portrays black children as a "binary other" to romanticized depictions of white children, specifically angelic white girls.

=== Commonwealth countries ===
Piccaninny is considered an offensive term for an Aboriginal Australian child. It was used in colonial Australia and is still in use in some Indigenous Kriol languages. Piccaninny (sometimes spelled picanninnie) is found in numerous Australian place names, such as Piccaninnie Ponds and Piccaninny Lake in South Australia, Piccaninny crater and Picaninny Creek in Western Australia and Picaninny Point in Tasmania.

The term was used in 1831 in an anti-slavery tract "The History of Mary Prince, a West Indian Slave, related by herself" published in Edinburgh, Scotland. In 1826 an Englishman named Thomas Young was tried at the Old Bailey in London on a charge of enslaving and selling four Gabonese women known as "Nura, Piccaninni, Jumbo Jack and Prince Quarben". The New Partridge Dictionary of Slang and Unconventional English says that in the United Kingdom today, piccaninny is considered highly offensive and derogatory, or negative and judgemental when used by other black people. It was controversially used ("wide-grinning picaninnies") in a letter quoted by the British Conservative politician Enoch Powell in his 1968 "Rivers of Blood" speech. In a 2002 column for The Daily Telegraph, Boris Johnson wrote, "It is said that the Queen has come to love the Commonwealth, partly because it supplies her with regular cheering crowds of flag-waving piccaninnies."

== In popular culture ==
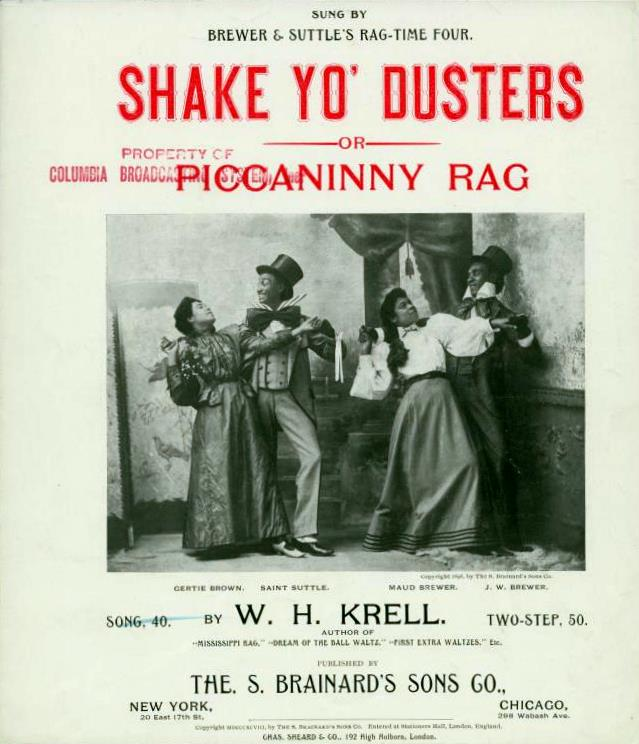
"Shake Yo' Dusters, or, Piccaninny Rag", sheet music of an 1898 song by William Krell.

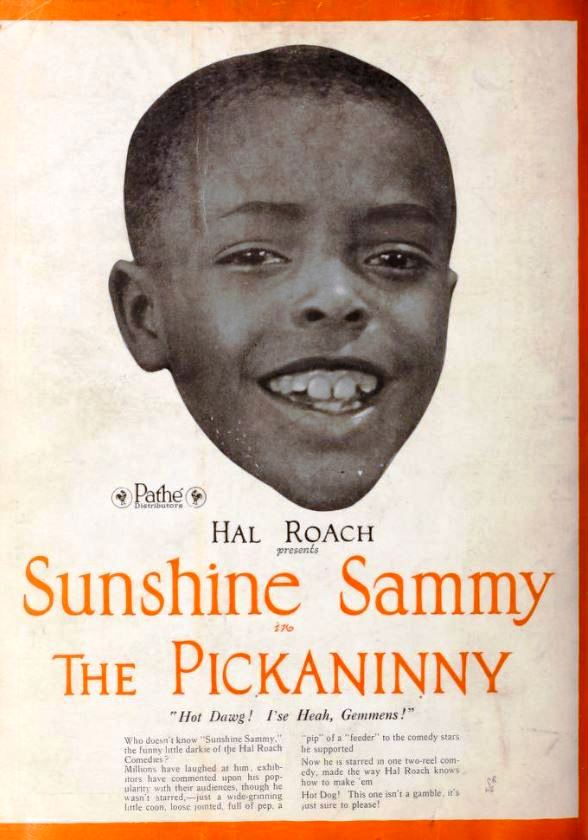
Advertisement for the comedy short film The Pickaninny (1921) with Ernie Morrison aka "Sunshine Sammy."

=== Literature ===
- 1911 – In the novel Peter and Wendy by J. M. Barrie, the Indians of Neverland are members of the Piccaninny tribe. Writer Sarah Laskow describes them as "a blanket stand-in for 'others' of all stripes, from Aboriginal populations in Australia to descendants of slaves in the United States" who generally communicate in pidgin with lines such as "Ugh, ugh, wah!".
- 1936 – In Margaret Mitchell's best-selling epic Gone with the Wind, the character Melanie Wilkes objects to her husband's intended move to New York City because it would mean that their son Beau would be educated alongside "Yankees" and "pickaninnies".

=== Television ===
- 2015 – Season 1 Episode 14 of Shark Tank Australia featured Piccaninny Tiny Tots which has since changed its name to Kakadu Tiny Tots.
- 2020 – Episode 8 (Jig-A-Bobo) of the HBO television series Lovecraft Country features a character chased by Topsy and Bopsy, two ghoulish monsters depicted as "pickaninny" caricatures.

== See also ==
- Nadir of American race relations – Late 19th-/early 20th-century period of US history
- The Story of Little Black Sambo – 1899 children's book by Helen Bannerman
