= Triangle of Life =

Unsubstantiated theory about how to survive a major earthquake

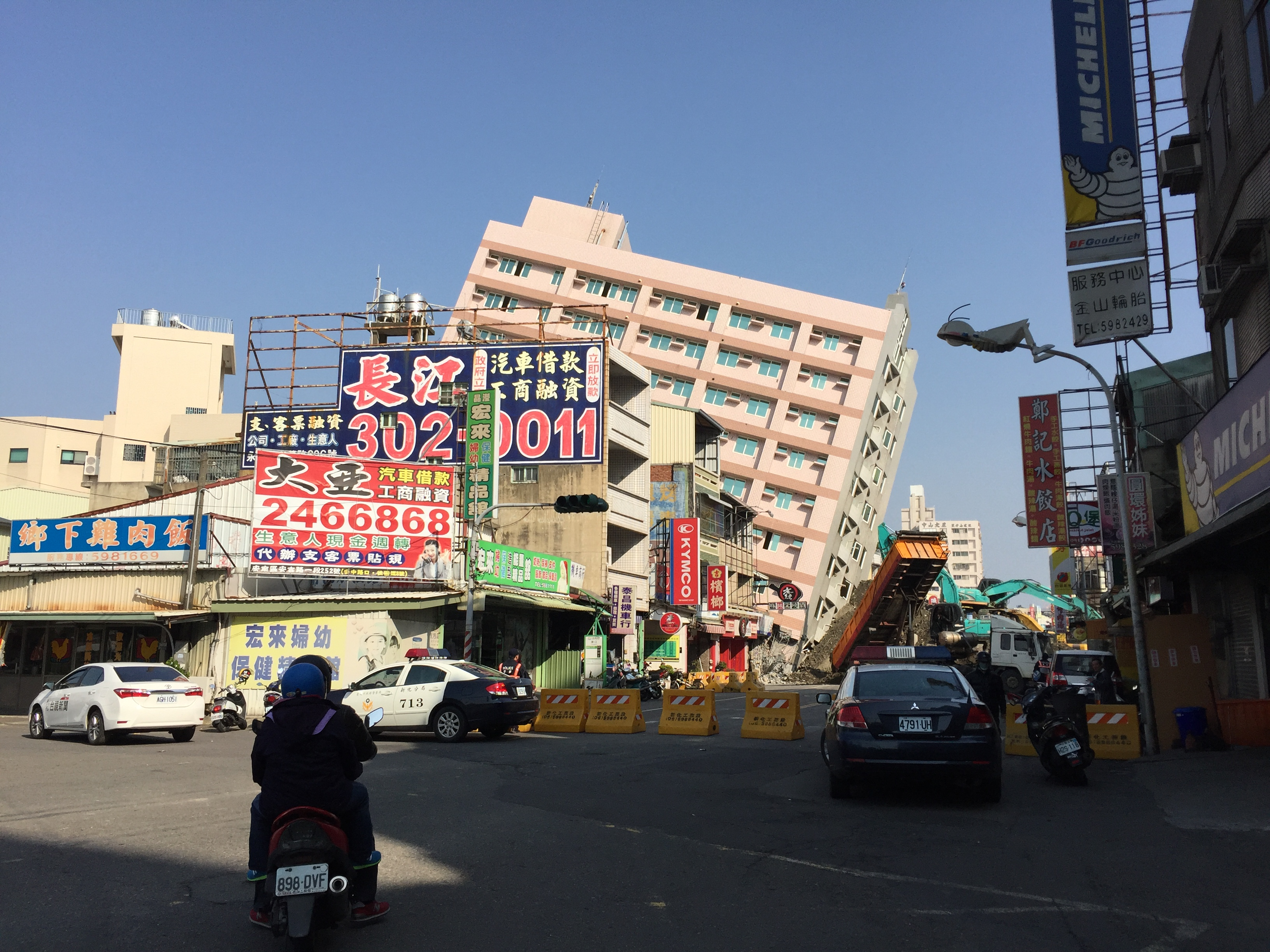
Most fatalities are caused by falling objects, against which the "Triangle of Life" method is ineffective.

The Triangle of Life is an unsubstantiated idea about how to survive a major earthquake, typically promoted via viral emails. The idea advocates methods of protection very different from the mainstream advice of "drop, cover, and hold on" method that is widely supported by reputable agencies.

In particular, the method's developer and key proponent, Doug Copp, recommends that at the onset of a major earthquake, building occupants should seek shelter near solid items that will provide a protective space, a void or space that could prevent injury or permit survival in the event of a major structural failure, a "pancake collapse", and specifically advises against sheltering under tables.

Officials of many agencies, including the American Red Cross and the United States Geological Survey, have criticized the "Triangle of Life" idea, saying that it is a "misguided idea" and inappropriate for countries with modern building construction standards where total building collapse is unlikely.

== Purpose ==
The Triangle of Life does not address the common instance of furniture toppling over during an earthquake.

Copp's idea is focused on situations when a building completely collapses, falling straight down, rather than the far more common situations, when side-to-side shaking causes falling objects (such as trees, chimneys, furniture, and objects on shelves) to land on top of people. According to his idea, if the building collapses, then the weight of the ceilings falling upon the objects or furniture inside tends to crush them, but the height of the object that remains acts as a kind of roof beam over the space or void next to it, which will tend to end up with a sloping roof over it. Copp terms this space for survival the "triangle of life". The larger and stronger the object, the less it will compact; the less it compacts, the larger the void next to it will be. Such triangles are the most common shape to be found in a collapsed building.

== Criticisms ==
According to the United States Geological Survey (USGS), the Triangle of Life is a misguided idea about the best location a person should try to occupy during an earthquake. Critics have argued that it is actually very difficult to know where these triangles will be formed, as objects (including large, heavy objects) often move around during earthquakes. It is also argued that this movement means that lying beside heavy objects is very dangerous. Statistical studies of earthquake deaths show most injuries and deaths occur due to falling objects, not structures.

A person is more likely to be injured trying to move during an earthquake rather than immediately seeking a safe space by furniture, or near an interior wall, not doorways, as they are often not structural. Different architectural standards in different countries mean that the best strategy for earthquake survival could also be different; however, for the United States, "Drop, Cover, and Hold On" is recommended.

An Iranian peer-reviewed article analyzed and compared both methods in detail, considering their application, the extent of people who are under the coverage, simplicity in transferring concepts, and the probability of reducing casualties and damage in developing countries such as Iran. It argued that "Drop, Cover and Hold on" was useful advice for people who experience smaller earthquakes without total building collapse, which is the vast majority of earthquake survivors. It found that the "Triangle of life" theoretically could be a better strategy during larger earthquakes in buildings with a skeleton (wood or concrete) during a building pancake-type collapse, but acknowledged the possible problems of large objects shifting and crushing the person from horizontal movement, inability to predict which side of an object would create a survivable space, and that the triangle of life method is also difficult to teach and communicate. It concluded that the "Triangle of Life" could harm individuals who attempted to follow the advice in buildings that did not collapse. Neither strategy was useful for the majority of the population in rural Iran because of the mud-brick architecture which has no structure. Based on the simplicity of teaching and the fact that 12,000 times more people are affected by smaller earthquakes and injured, they concluded that "Drop, Cover and Hold On" is still regarded as a better option for people during an earthquake.

== Testing ==
In 1996, Copp claims to have made a film to prove this methodology and to have recreated a model school and home, filling them with 20 mannequins. The buildings were collapsed by earthmoving equipment that knocked the supporting pillars out. Half the mannequins were in "Duck and Cover" positions and the others in Copp's "Triangle of Life" positions. When Copp and his crew re-entered the building after the blast, they calculated that there would have been no survivors among the mannequins in "Duck and Cover" positions, but 100% survival for those hiding in the triangles beside solid objects. Copp is categorical about the importance of this technique, saying "Everyone who simply ducks and covers when buildings collapse is crushed to death – every time without exception."

However, a critic of Copp has stated that this was a rescue exercise rather than an experiment. Additionally, the exercise did not simulate the lateral movement of earthquakes, instead causing a pancake collapse, which is more common in areas of extremely poor construction and rare in developed countries. The critic concluded that Copp's results are therefore misleading.

== See also ==
- Earthquake engineering
- Earthquake preparedness
- Earthquake early warning system
- Seismic retrofit
