= Ahmed Pochee =

British-Indian wine merchant

- Born: 23 August 1939; London, England
- Died: 18 December 1998 (aged 59); London, England
- Occupations: wine merchant, businessman, entrepreneur
- Known for: Oddbins and the Great Wapping Wine Company

Ahmed Pochee (23 September 1939 – 18 December 1998) was a British-Indian wine merchant and entrepreneur, notably the founder of Oddbins and the Great Wapping Wine Company.

== Early life ==
Pochee was born on 23 September 1939, to an Indian father of Arab or Persian descent. His father had become blind whilst studying medicine, but despite his disability, he worked as a chef and opened the first Indian restaurant in Edinburgh.
