= Oddbins =

British alcohol retail chain

- Company type: Private
- Industry: Wine retailing
- Founded: 1963
- Founder: Ahmed Pochee
- Defunct: November 2023
- Headquarters: London, England
- Area served: United Kingdom
- Key people: Ayo Akintola MD
- Products: Wine, beer, spirits
- Owner: European Food Brokers
- Website: oddbins.com

Oddbins was an off-licence retail chain in the United Kingdom, established in 1963 by Ahmed Pochee. The chain operated 46 branches with 30 in London, nine in Scotland and across the rest of the UK, under the leadership of managing director Ayo Akintola. It also operated a trade arm, Oddbins Wholesale, which supplies restaurants, pubs, bars and other businesses throughout the UK.

== History ==
In 1963, entrepreneur Ahmed Pochee established a small business delivering "bin-ends" and "oddments" of wine to restaurants and clubs in the West End of London. Ten years later the company was purchased by Nick Baile and Dennis Ing, but it wasn't until the early 1980s that the company's distinct style was discovered. Illustrator Ralph Steadman was asked by Gordon Kerr, the marketing director at that time, to produce ten drawings similar in style to his illustrations for Fear and Loathing in Las Vegas. Steadman continued working for Oddbins for the next 12 years.

Due to the levels of debt within the business in the late 1980s, Oddbins was acquired by Seagram, a distribution company based in the United States. During this period, Oddbins was largely permitted to develop with autonomy, albeit with incentive to strongly promote the Seagram brands.

The company grew from 100 to 278 locations and came to be regarded as a favourite of a generation of wine drinkers.

French Castel Group, who also owned the Nicolas chain from 2002-2008, purchased the company. It was then bought by Simon Baile, son of Nick Baile. Oddbins operated 158 stores in the United Kingdom, including 20 in London, four in Ireland and one in Calais, France.

In 2010 the company launched a new off-licence and convenience store concept called "Oddies."

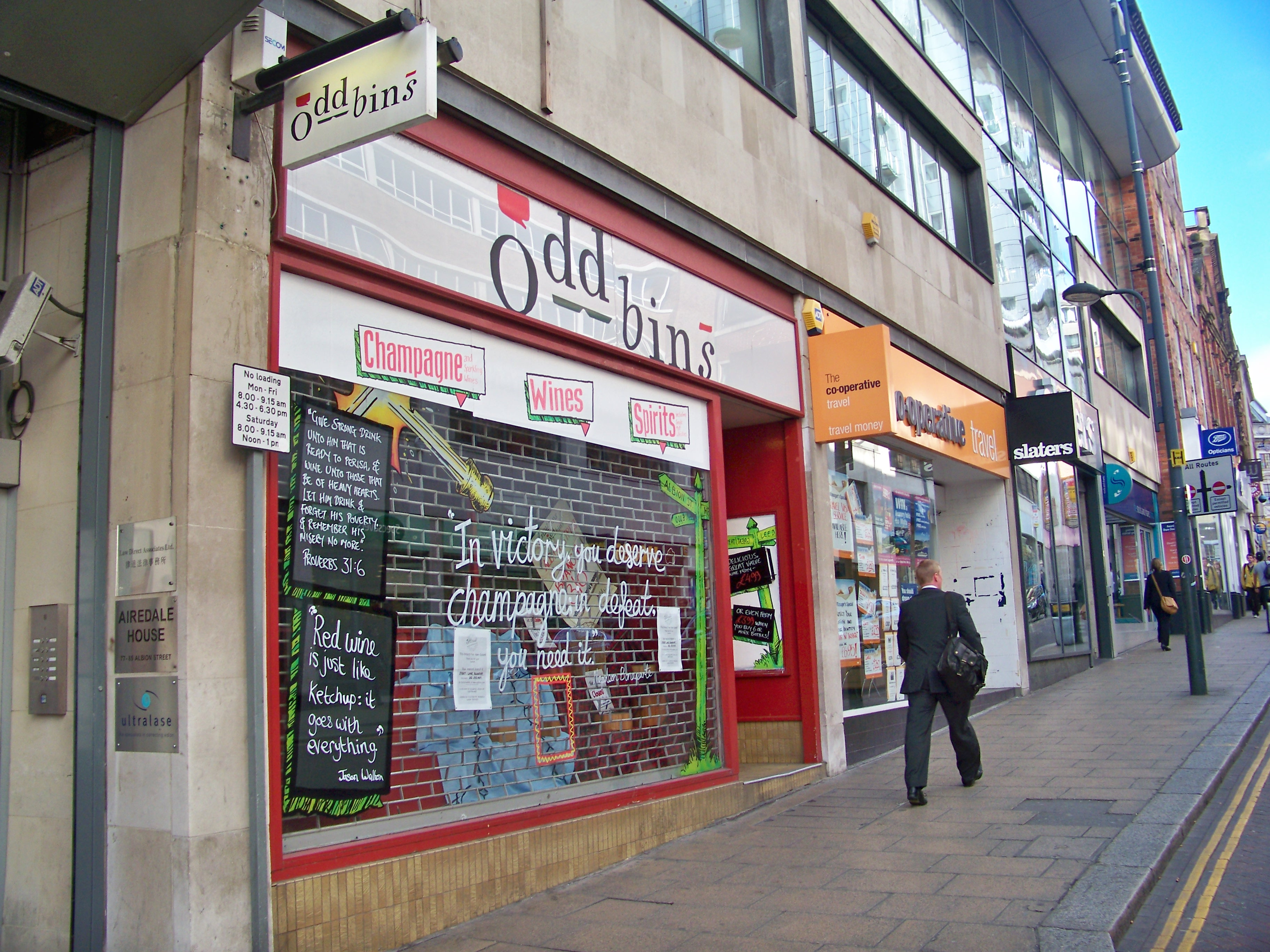
A closed branch on Albion Street, Leeds April 2011

In early 2011 Oddbins closed a third of its branches, reducing the number remaining open to under 100, leading to a proposal to enter a company voluntary arrangement (CVA). In April 2011, Oddbins went into administration, following the breakdown of talks over the CVA after objections from HM Revenue & Customs, which is owed nearly half of the chains' total debt of £20 million. On 26 April, Whittalls Wine Merchants, part of Raj Chatha's European Food Brokers, bought 37 of the shops from the administrators in a move that saved 200 jobs. and acquired the exclusive rights to the name. The remaining 48 shops were closed by the administrators.

On 19 October 2011 the new owners officially relaunched Oddbins. On 1 February 2019, Oddbins again went into administration.

In October 2023, it was confirmed that Oddbins is on the market for some or all of their shops. However, in November 2023 it was reported that they had closed all of their physical stores with the aim of switching to a purely online presence. In December 2023, European Food Brokers was placed in administration.

== See also ==
- Majestic Wine
- First Quench Retailing
