= Ellen Clapsaddle =

American illustrator (1865–1934)

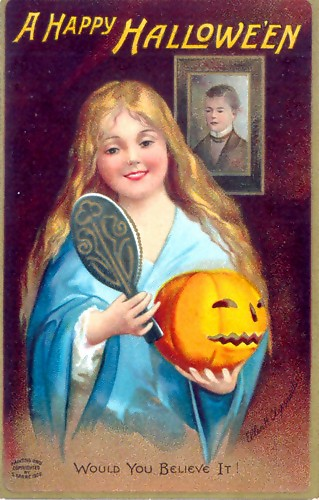
A Hallowe'en postcard, illustrated by Ellen Clapsaddle. This postcard depicts a girl trying to see her future husband in the mirror on Hallowe'en night.

Ellen Hattie Clapsaddle (January 8, 1865 - January 7, 1934) was an American illustrator/commercial artist in the late 19th and early 20th centuries. She is recognized as the most prolific souvenir postcard and greeting card artist of her era.

== Childhood ==
Clapsaddle was born in the small farming community of South Columbia in Herkimer County, New York, near Columbia, New York on January 8, 1865.

She was the child of Dennis L. and Harriet Clapsaddle, née Beckwith. She is said to have been a shy and delicate child who displayed artistic ability and was highly encouraged by her parents to develop her skills in art.

Clapsaddle was the great-granddaughter of the American Revolutionary War hero, Major Dennis Clapsaddle.

== Education ==
Clapsaddle attended a one-room school until the 8th grade. She then boarded in Richfield Springs, Otsego County, New York, and attended the local Richfield Springs Seminary, a local academy that prepared young ladies for higher education. She graduated in 1882.

Upon the completion of her studies, around 1884, she returned to her parents' home in South Columbia, NY. Clapsaddle's father died on January 5, 1891, and she and her mother went to live with an aunt in Richfield Springs.

== Career ==
Clapsaddle started giving art lessons in 1894. She created her own landscapes and was commissioned to paint portraits of families in Richfield Springs. She also submitted her work to publishers in New York City and became a recognized commercial artist.

Two of her card designs, accepted by the International Art Publishing Company in New York City, became bestsellers. Several other purchases followed and the company retained her to work with their stable of artists. Thanks to the popularity of her designs, she became their premier illustrator, and the company invited her to move to the city around 1895. Her illustrations were often used in advertising and on porcelain goods, calendars, paper fans, trade and greeting cards.

In 1901, the International Art Publishing Company offered a paid two-year trip to Germany for Clapsaddle and her mother. Germany was the center of the high-end publishing world and many publishers in the United States depended on them for the final products that were shipped to the U.S. In Germany Clapsaddle worked directly with the German engravers who manufactured the company's products. Her designs began appearing in Valentine's Day cards, souvenir postcards, booklets, watercolor prints, calendars, and trade cards.

Clapsaddle spent some years in Germany, funded by the International Art Publishing Company, and then returned to New York well before her mother's death in 1905. It is said that she established the Wolf Company backed by the Wolf brothers—a full subsidiary of the International Art Publishing Company of New York City. She was the first and only female souvenir postcard artist of the era to establish her own enterprise. She was the sole artist and designer for this company. At that time, few women were even employed as full-time illustrators. For eight years she and the Wolf brothers enjoyed their success and there seemed to be no limit to the growth potential in the souvenir and postcard industry. (Some sources suggest that she was employed by the Wolf brothers). Nevertheless, confidence in the boom and high return in profits led her and her partners to invest heavily in the years that followed in several Germany engraving and publishing firms. She returned once again to Germany to work with their engravers and publishers.

== World War I ==
By 1914, World War I broke out. The majority of the souvenir postcard publishers in the United States depended on German supplying firms. Disconnected from their suppliers, U.S. publishers were forced out of business, including Clapsaddle. Many German factories suffered total destruction from bombings and all of Clapsaddle's original artwork of the period is believed lost. Clapsaddle herself returned to the United States in 1915. News of her safe arrival was posted in her hometown newspaper, the Richfield Springs Mercury, July 29, 1915: "People generally will be interested in knowing that the artist, Miss Ellen Clapsaddle, who is a native of this place, has returned from Berlin, where she has spent several years, and has notified her friends of her safe arrival in New York."

== Post-war ==
From 1915 on Clapsaddle worked and lived in New York City, visiting her second home in Richfield Springs NY often (as evidenced by many newspaper posts in the Richfield Springs Mercury). On April 9, 1920, Clapsaddle, who spent the winter months in New York City, moved to her home in the Chase House on Lake Street. In 1920, she was living in an apartment in Manhattan at the elegant Prince George Hotel, as stated in the 1920 census, as per the U.S Census. In 1930 she was living as a lodger in Manhattan, at 125 East 30th St. according to the U. S. Census

In January 1932, she was admitted to the Peabody Home for Aged and Indigent Women on Pelham Parkway in New York City.

== Death ==
She died January 7, 1934, one day short of her 69th birthday. Services were held in Richfield Springs on January 10, 1934, and she was buried alongside her parents in Lake View Cemetery.

== Art and legacy ==
Clapsaddle's greatest success was in the development of her artwork into single-faced cards that could be kept as souvenirs or mailed as postcards and she specialized in designing illustrations specifically for that purpose. Artistic designs had become highly prized particularly during the peak of production of the "golden age of souvenir postcards" (1898–1915) for their great marketing possibilities. Clapsaddle is credited with over 3000 designs in the souvenir post card field. More than half of her estimated 3,000 works depict children, often of different races and cultures of the world. Holidays, particularly Halloween, Valentine's Day, and Christmas, are a common theme in her work.

One of her 1910 card designs, Midnight Angel, was chosen by the United States Postal Service for the 1995 traditional Christmas Stamp. Clapsaddle's artwork still appears today in prints and commercial art.

Some private collectors have amassed more than 1,600 original Clapsaddles, as her souvenir postcards are commonly known. The original cards have appeared in local and state trade shows for years and many websites have large numbers available where the number varies from 900 to 1,000 cards are offered surpassing the numbers available for other artists of similar work. "Original" single-faced cards are sought after by collectors, as well as her signed "mechanical" cards. A long-time collector, Elizabeth Austin, created a "checklist" of Clapsaddle's souvenir postcards for other collectors so they can identify the ones they do not have. The late Ellen Budd expanded on the list with many missing cards and has published them as a reference work.

== Bibliography ==
- Halloween Postcard Book—by Ellen Clapsaddle and others, Applewood Books; 10pp., 2004.
- Ellen H. Clapsaddle Signed Post Cards: An Illustrated Reference Guide, Ellen H. Budd, EH Budd; 194pp., 1989.
- The Official Guide to Flea Market Prices, 2nd edition, Harry Rinker, House of Collectibles; 512pp., 2004.
- Death Makes a Holiday: A Cultural History of Halloween, David J. Skal, 256pp., 2002.
