= First Quench Retailing =

Former chain of off-licences in the UK

- Type: Private
- Industry: Retail
- Founded: 1998 (Merger of Threshers and Victoria Wine forming First Quench)
- Headquarters: Welwyn Garden City, England
- Products: Alcoholic beverages
- Website: www.threshergroup.com/

First Quench Retailing was the largest independent off-licence retail chain in the UK, with around 3,500 shops operating under several retail brands, though all have now been closed. At the time of First Quench's closure, these included the Threshers, Bottoms Up, Drinks Cabin, Haddows, The Local and Wine Rack chains.

Its head office was based in Welwyn Garden City, Hertfordshire. On 29 October 2009 it was announced that the company had gone into administration.

== History ==
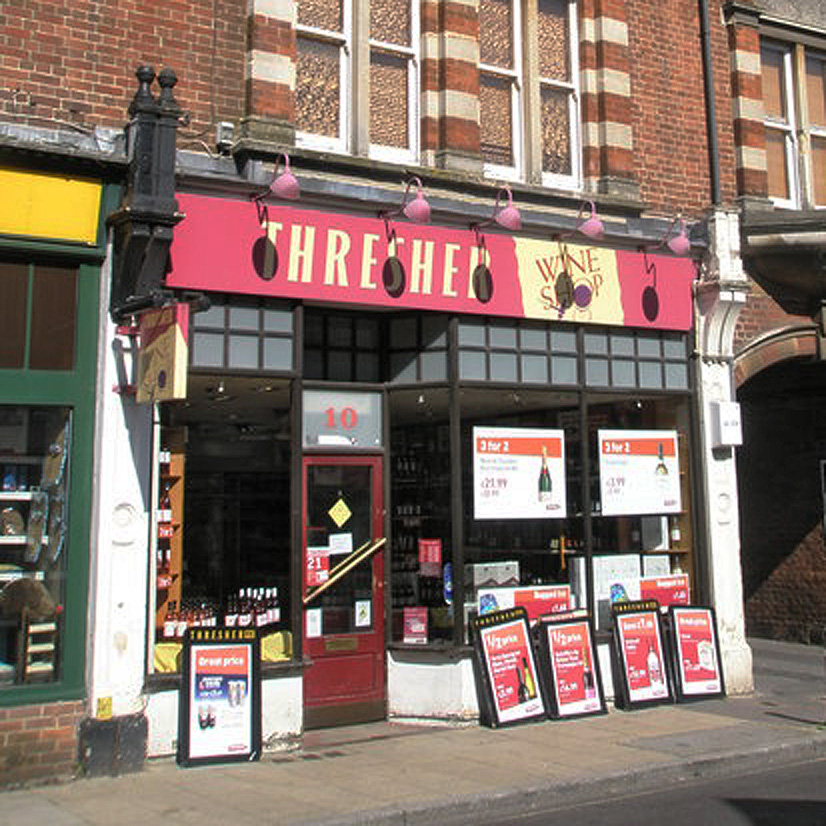
Threshers branch in Petersfield in 2008.

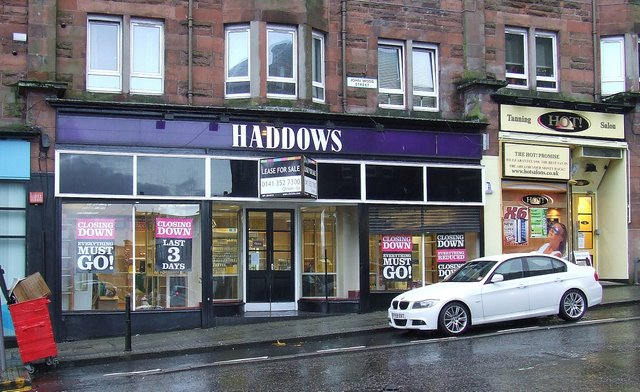
Haddows branch in Port Glasgow during closing-down sale in late 2009.

The company was originally formed as First Quench Retailing by the merger of the Whitbread owned Threshers and the Allied Domecq owned Victoria Wine in August 1998. This brought together the 1,470 Thresher Wine Shop, Drinks Cabin, Wine Rack, "Bottoms Up" and Huttons brands with around 1,500 Victoria Wine, Wine Cellar, Haddows, Martha's Vineyard, and The Firkin. Allied Domecq later sold their 50% of the company to Punch Taverns in September 1999.

In November 1991, Threshers, then owned by Whitbread alone, had bought the Peter Bottomfield Dominic Group from Grand Metropolitan for £50m. The Bottoms Up brand of shops, formerly owned by Peter Bottomfield Dominic, was retained. Peter (Bottomfield) Dominic was separated from GrandMet's IDV group in 1989 to become a retail division.

At time of the merger, the company employed around 20,000 people and claimed to account for around 13% of the take home drinks market – Tesco, in comparison, claimed around 14%. The number of stores and employees were gradually reduced in the years following, although it remained the largest off-licence chain until the company's demise in 2009.

The company's stores were split across several brand focussed trading divisions which were eventually reduced to two. A wine-led division included their premium brand and high wine mix stores, with the 'drinks division' focussed around their convenience driven and drinks-led shops.

The company was purchased by the Japanese private equity firm Nomura Holdings in October 2000 for £225m.

Terra Firma Capital Partners purchased the company in April 2002.

In March 2003 Terra Firma Capital Partners dispensed with the First Quench name and adopted Thresher Group as the overall company identity and trading name – First Quench Retailing Limited remained the legal name.

In July 2003 the company acquired gourmet meal business Leaping Salmon to attempt exploit the natural links between food and wine. They later experimented rebranding some stores 'Thresher + Food' to offer premium ready meals, but after the experiment proved unsuccessful, those stores were eventually reverted to either the 'Thresher's' or 'Wine Rack' brands.

The collapse of rival retailer Unwins led to Threshers buying 200 stores, with the remaining 170 stores closing. The stores were rebranded as either 'The Local', 'Thresher's' or 'Wine Rack'.

In June 2007, Thresher Group was sold to the equity company Vision Capital for around £250 million.

In 2008 the company reverted to using the First Quench Retailing (FQR) name from Thresher Group.

On 29 October 2009 it was announced that First Quench Retailing had entered into administration, and KPMG were appointed administrators. The following day, 81 redundancies were made at the company's head office in Welwyn Garden City.

The brand names Thresher's, The Local, Bottoms Up and Victoria Wine were subsequently purchased by Midlands-based newsagent, off-licence and convenience store operator Dave's Discount Group. The Wine Rack brand was purchased by Convivality Plc (at the time registered as Bargain Booze Holdings Limited).

== Previous branding ==
=== Brands trading at closure ===
==== Primarily wine with beer/ale/cider ====
Wine Rack (True Blue) (customer service and product knowledge driven)

==== Value and convenience goods including alcohol ====
The Local (Yellow)
Threshers (Red)

==== Scottish brand, with main focus on wine/beer/cider/ale ====
Haddows (Purple)

=== Brands which were phased out or renamed after takeovers or restructures ===
==== Wine-led ====
Bottoms Up (offering up to 650 brands of wine in one shop)
Wine Rack
Victoria Wine
Peter Dominic
Martha's Vineyard

==== Drink retailing ====
Threshers
Drinks Cabin
Unwins
Firkin Off-Licence
Hutton's
Drinks Direct

== See also ==
- Majestic Wine
- Oddbins
