= Viral email =

Email that propagates rapidly

A viral email (also known as a "pass-along email") is an email which rapidly propagates from person to person, generally in a word-of-mouth manner. It is an example of a viral phenomenon, which is used for profit in viral marketing, but can also contribute to the propagation of Internet memes like viral videos.

== Overview ==
A viral emails spreads when a person receives an email, often of a political or humorous nature, and forwards it to people they know. These people do the same, and thus they spread the email, potentially worldwide. In this sense, the process is similar to that of an email chain letter, but typically without the explicit requirement to pass it along that is a common part of the chain letter model. A common commercial application for viral emails is that of the viral advertising campaigns: promotional emails are specifically created so that they follow a viral propagation. Another form of viral email offers life-saving advice, such as Triangle of Life, which is passed around by well-meaning people even though agencies, governments and scientists have issued statements warning of its dangers.

== Behavior ==
A 2004 study into viral email behaviors identified a number of reasons as to why people may pass along emails. Most of the emails that were passed along involved humor, although other factors - such as the presence of naked pictures and warnings about crime - were identified as being significant. This tends to be replicated in commercial viral emails, where humor is a common theme, and where more risque content is often employed. The same study also examined reasons for not passing along emails, and noted that the most common reason was "the sense that the content was old."

== Commercial implications ==
In viral marketing, the aim is to spread awareness about a product offering, service or concept using word-of-mouth behaviors. Unlike spam, which is based on a massive distribution of unsolicited emails, viral emails use social networking aspects to ensure their goals of wide propagation. This is one of the strengths of viral email to marketers - while users are quick to delete email from marketers, they are less likely to delete the email if it comes from a person that they know.

As an example of viral marketing in practice, vouchers may be provided via email to customers, who are then encouraged to forward those emails on to friends and family. In 2006, Threshers (a UK-based off-licence retail chain) emailed vouchers to staff and suppliers. The emails were then redistributed by recipients, ultimately resulting in many of their branches almost running out of stock when the vouchers were honored by the company. While at the time the Thresher Group denied that they were attempting to run a viral email-based marketing campaign, the company repeated the exercise the following year. Similarly, a campaign for a Ferrari test drive garnered over 40,000 responses even though only 5,000 emails had been sent.

Many viral emails that may appear to be advertisements are, in fact, fake, and run the risk of significantly damaging the brand.

== Collections ==
A number of websites are dedicated to collecting viral emails, often with a particular focus on humorous emails. These include Viralbank, which collects both commercial and non-commercial emails, Bore Me, which features a section devoted to adult viral emails, and ViralEmails, a forum based website allowing its users to share viral emails as well as a daily viral email sent via a newsletter.
