= Coon Chicken Inn =

American restaurant chain

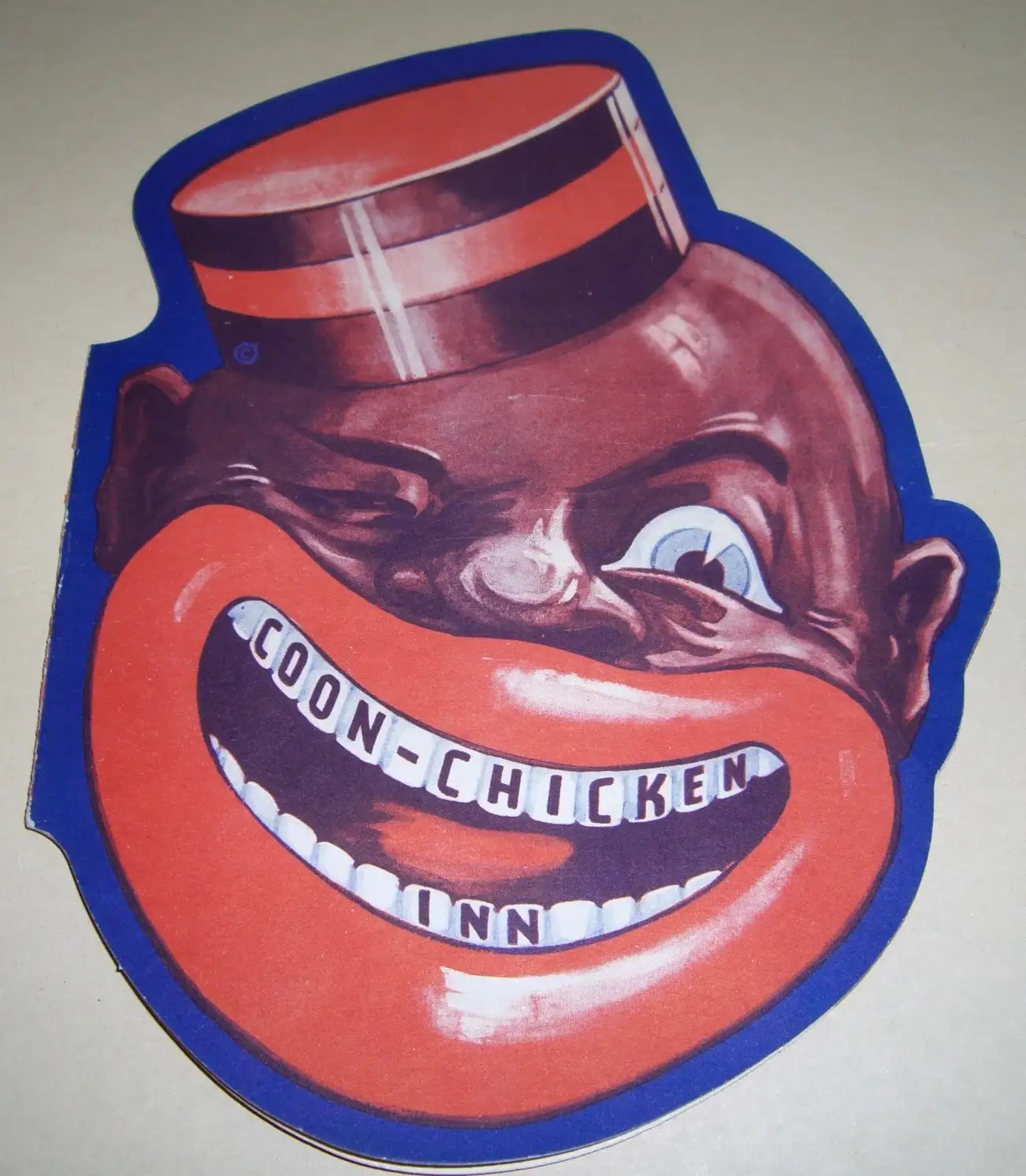
- Industry: Restaurant
- Founded: 1925; 101 years ago in Salt Lake City
- Defunct: 1957; 69 years ago
- Fate: Closure due to change in popular standards concerning racial intolerance
- Number of locations: 3 at height (1931–1947)
- Key people: Maxon Lester Graham
- Products: Fried chicken

Coon Chicken Inn was an American chain of three restaurants founded by Maxon Lester Graham and Adelaide Burt in 1925, which prospered until the late 1950s. The restaurant's name contained the word Coon, considered a racial slur, and the trademarks and entrances of the restaurants were designed to look like a smiling caricature of an African American porter. The smiling capped porter head also appeared on menus, dishes, and promotional items. Due to changes in popular culture and the general consideration of being culturally and racially offensive, the chain was closed by 1957.

The first Coon Chicken Inn was opened in suburban Salt Lake City, Utah, in 1925. In 1929, another restaurant was opened in then-suburban Lake City, Seattle, and a third was opened in the Hollywood District of Portland, Oregon, in 1931. A fourth location was advertised but never opened in Spokane, Washington. Later, a cabaret, orchestra, and catering were added to the Seattle and Salt Lake restaurants. The Portland location at 5474 NE Sandy Blvd. closed in 1949 and was converted into another restaurant. The Seattle location also closed in 1949 and is no longer standing. The Salt Lake City location at 2960 S. (sometimes listed as 2950 S.) Highland Drive closed in 1957.

== See also ==
- Sambo's
- List of chicken restaurants
- List of defunct restaurants of the United States
