= Godiva (disambiguation) =

Godiva or Lady Godiva was an Anglo-Saxon noblewoman who, according to legend, rode naked through the streets of Coventry, in England, in order to gain a remission of the oppressive taxation imposed by her husband on his tenants.

Godiva or Lady Godiva may also refer to:

== Arts and entertainment ==
Films and television

- Lady Godiva (1911 film), an American silent historical drama film
- Lady Godiva (1921 film), a German silent historical drama film
- Lady Godiva (2008 film), a British romantic comedy film
- Godiva's, a Canadian television series depicting a small restaurant in Vancouver

Music

- Godiva's Hymn, traditional drinking song for engineers
- Godiva Festival, an annual festival of pop music held in July in the War Memorial Park, Coventry, England
- Godiva (album), a 2003 album by Godiva
- "Lady Godiva" (song), a 1966 song by Peter and Gordon, notably covered by Alex Day
- "Godiva", a song by Heaven Shall Burn from the 2013 album Veto

Other arts

- Godiva (comics), the name of three DC Comics characters
- "Godiva" (poem), an 1842 poem by Alfred Tennyson
- Lady Godiva (Lefebvre), an 1890 painting by Jules Joseph Lefebvre
- Lady Godiva (painting), an 1898 painting by John Collier

== Others ==
- Godiva (gastropod), a genus of nudibranchs (sea slugs)
- Godiva (horse), a racehorse
- 3018 Godiva, an asteroid
- Godiva Chocolatier, a chocolate maker
- Godiva device, an experimental nuclear reactor at the Los Alamos National Laboratory that caused a criticality accident in 1954
- Kohm Lady Godiva, a 1980s United States human-powered aircraft

== See also ==
- Lady Godiva syndrome or exhibitionism
- Lady Godiva Memorial Bnad (sic), organization of University of Toronto engineering students
- Lady Godiva of Coventry, an American historical film released in 1955
- Lady Godiva Rides Again, British comedy film released in 1951
- "Lady Godiva's Operation", a 1968 song by The Velvet Underground
- Lady Godiva in popular culture
