= Lady Godiva (Leighton) =

Painting by Edmund Blair Leighton

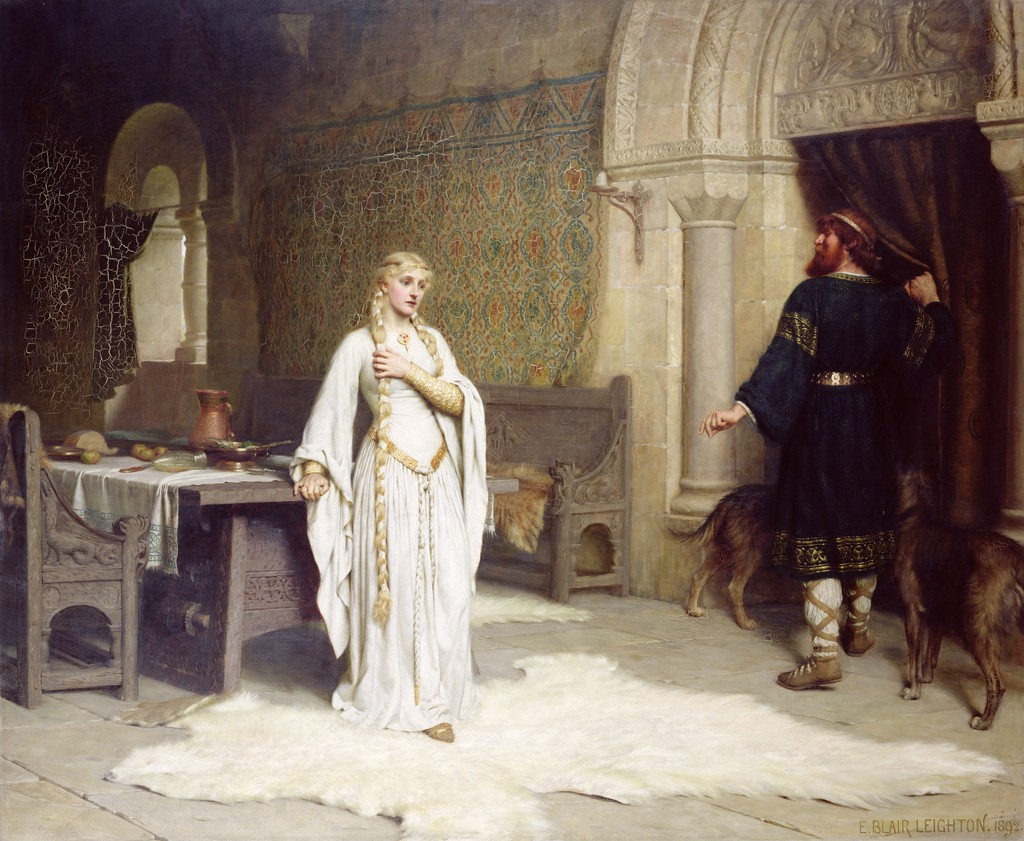
- Artist: Edmund Blair Leighton
- Year: 1892
- Medium: Oil on canvas
- Movement: Pre-Raphaelite
- Dimensions: 127 cm × 152.4 cm (50 in × 60.0 in)
- Owner: Leeds Museums & Galleries

Lady Godiva by Edmund Blair Leighton was painted in 1892.

Leighton based this painting on the episode in Tennyson's 1840 poem Godiva where Lady Godiva pleads with her husband Earl Leofric to lift the tax on the people of Coventry. The most common depiction of Lady Godiva in art is when she is riding naked through the streets, but Leighton apparently determined not to ‘bring a blush to the cheek of the young person’ and instead depicted a completely clothed Godiva making the bargain with her husband.

Leighton made greater efforts than most of his contemporaries toward historically accuracy, dressing the figures in attempts of authentic Anglo-Saxon clothes and placing them in a convincing-looking setting.

Lady Godiva is currently at Leeds Museums & Galleries, where it was acquired as a gift from Councillor R. Boston in 1893.

== Description ==
This painting depicts an opulent room adorned with fur carpets, stone arches and expertly carved woodwork. The central figure is Lady Godiva, who braces herself on a table. She has a horrified or stunned expression and clutches one of her braids, reacting to the challenge of riding naked through the streets. Godiva is wearing a white gown with golden adornments. Her long, blonde hair is braided with white ribbons. The wooden table she leans on is laden with food and drink, suggesting an interrupted meal. A man pulls back the curtain of the doorway to leave, looking back at Lady Godiva. He wears dark, richly decorated robes. Two hunting dogs are at his feet, looking beyond the curtain. The interplay of light and shadow, along with the meticulous detailing of textures and fabrics, imbues the scene with a sense of historical authenticity and narrative depth.

== Related works ==
- Lady Godiva (1902) by FA Philips is based on Leighton's painting Lady Godiva and is at the Herbert Art Gallery and Museum as part of the Godiva collection.
