= Self Sacrifice (statue) =

- The Lady Godiva Statue
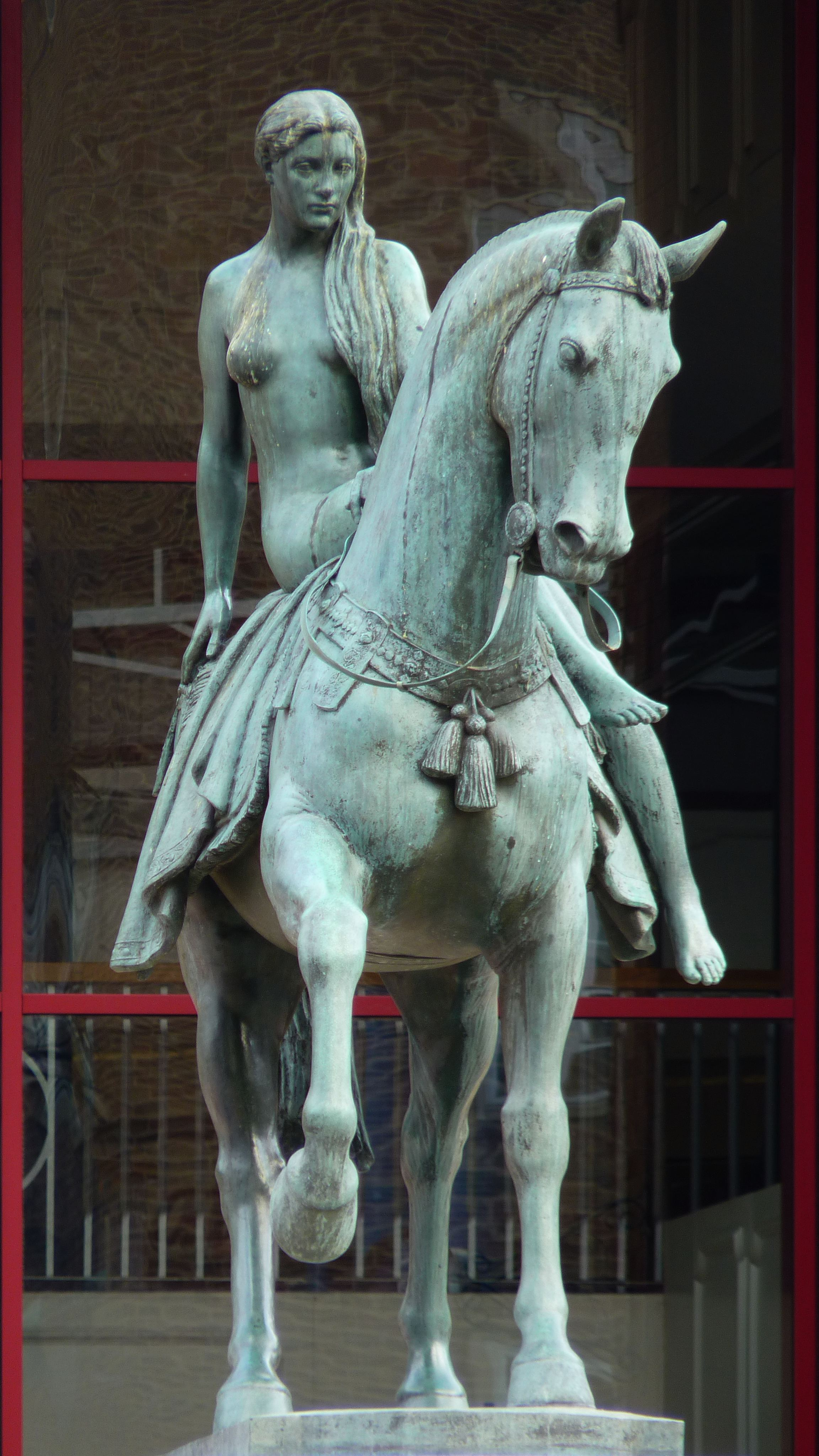
- Self Sacrifice in Broadgate, Coventry
- Interactive map of Self Sacrifice
- Location: Coventry, United Kingdom
- Coordinates: 52.40801°N 1.51041°W
- Designer: Sir William Reid Dick
- Type: Equestrian statue
- Material: Bronze and Portland stone
- Beginning date: 1936
- Completion date: 1949
- Opening date: 1949
- Dedicated to: Lady Godiva and the people of Coventry

Self Sacrifice, better known as the Lady Godiva statue is an equestrian statue of Lady Godiva in Broadgate, Coventry, England. The statue is bronze, on a plinth of Portland stone.

== History ==
The statue was initially commissioned in 1936 by William Bassett-Green, a wealthy local businessman but it was 1940 before a scale model had been produced by the sculptor, Sir William Reid Dick. Reid Dick worked through the Second World War to produce a full scale model of the statue. After the war the statue was cast and placed on a plinth influenced by Sir Edwin Lutyens, before finally being unveiled by Peggy Zinsser Douglas on 22 October 1949. The statue was adorned with the flags of the United Kingdom and the United States as Mrs Douglas was the wife of the American Ambassador, Lewis Williams Douglas. The statue was initially installed facing south, but was rotated to face west in 1989 during the construction of the Cathedral Lanes Shopping Centre. A canopy was erected over the statue at the same time, which was removed in 2008.

== Design ==
The statue depicts Lady Godiva on her naked ride through the city to protest her husband’s oppressive taxes. The plinth is inscribed with passages from Alfred, Lord Tennyson's poem Godiva along with a dedication from William Bassett-Green to Lady Godiva and the people of Coventry.

== Inscriptions ==
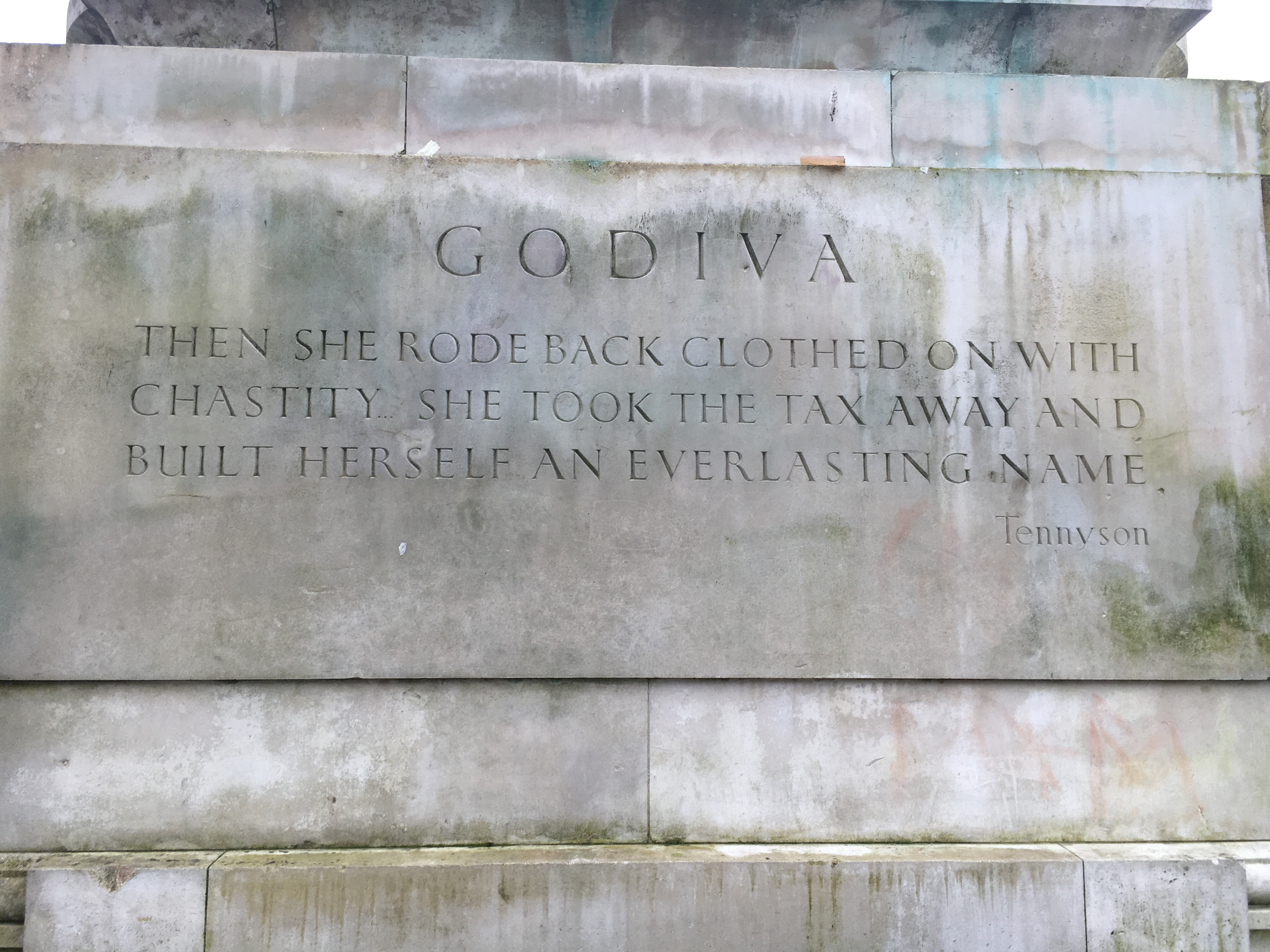
North face

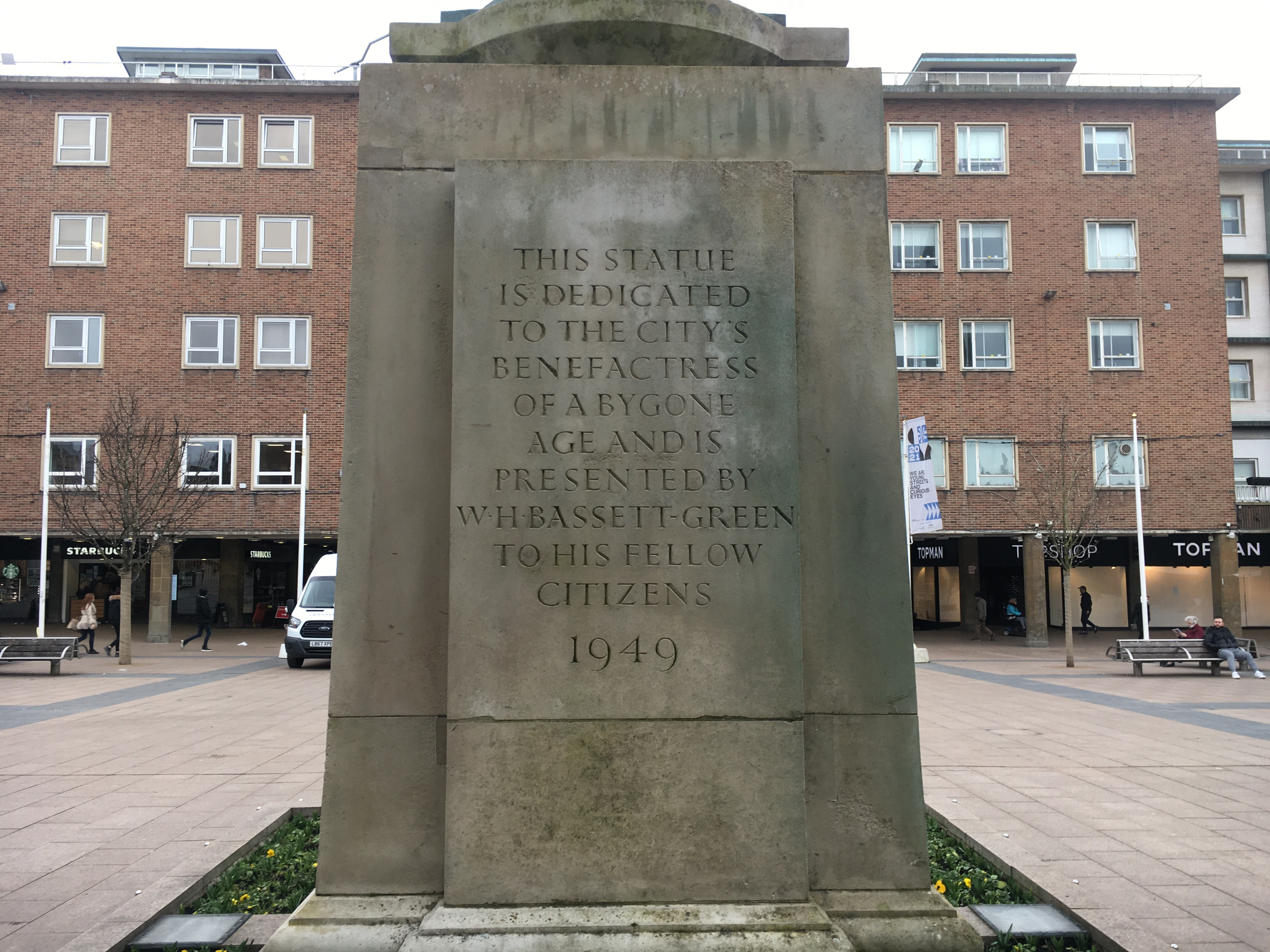
East face

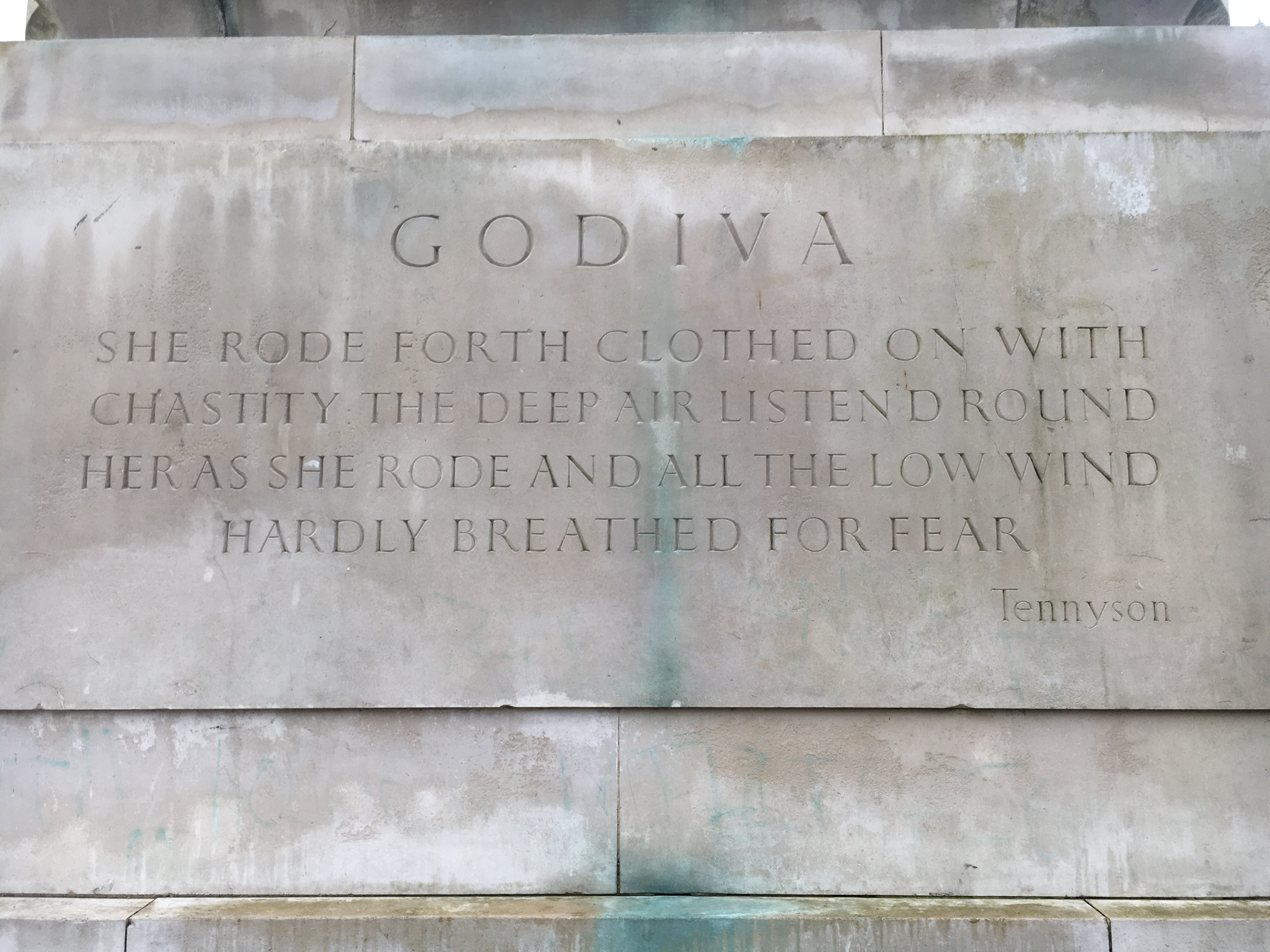
South face

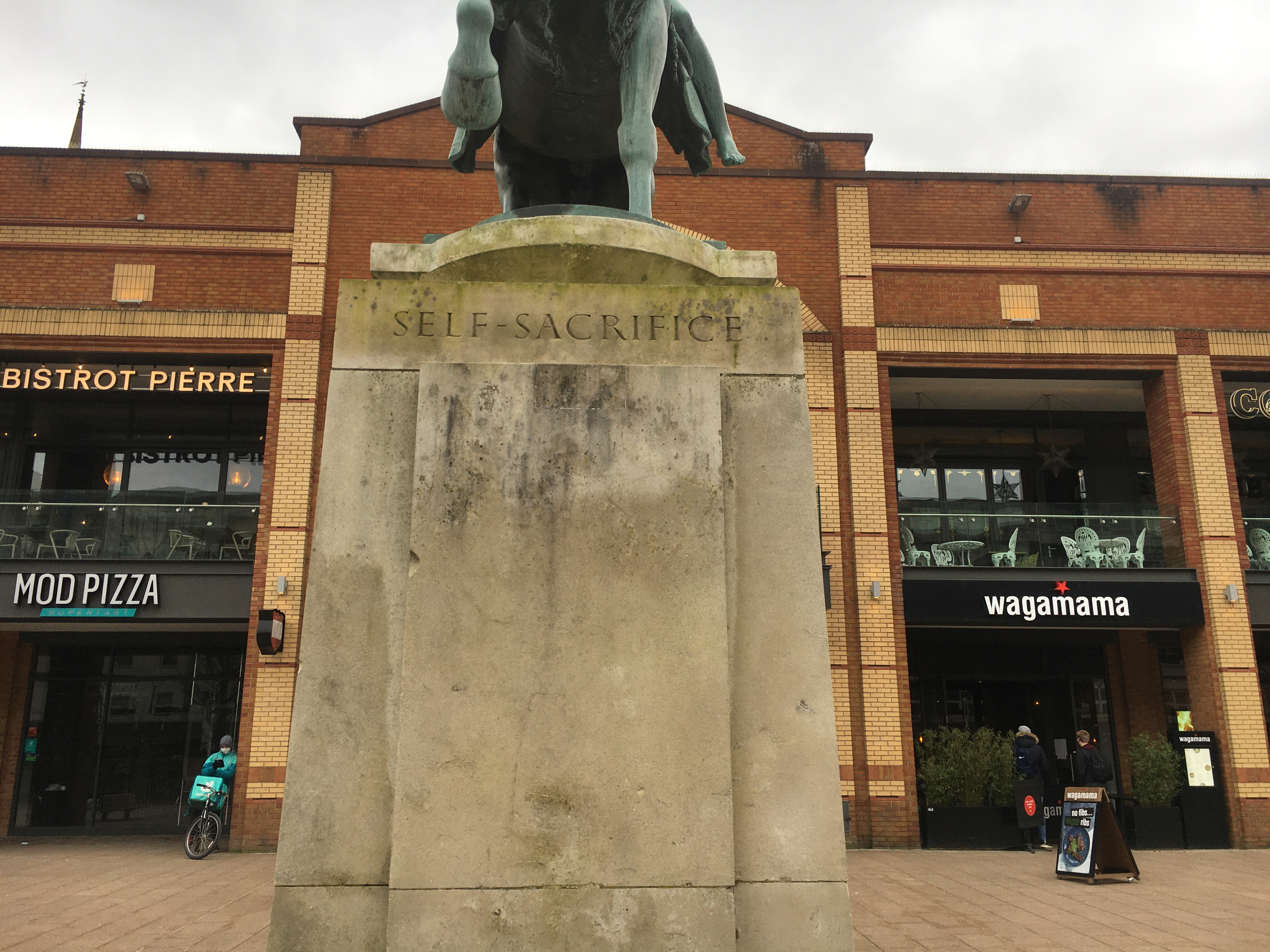
West face

== See also ==
- Grade II* listed buildings in Coventry
- List of equestrian statues in the United Kingdom
