= Lady Godiva =

11th-century Anglo-Saxon noblewoman and figure of legend

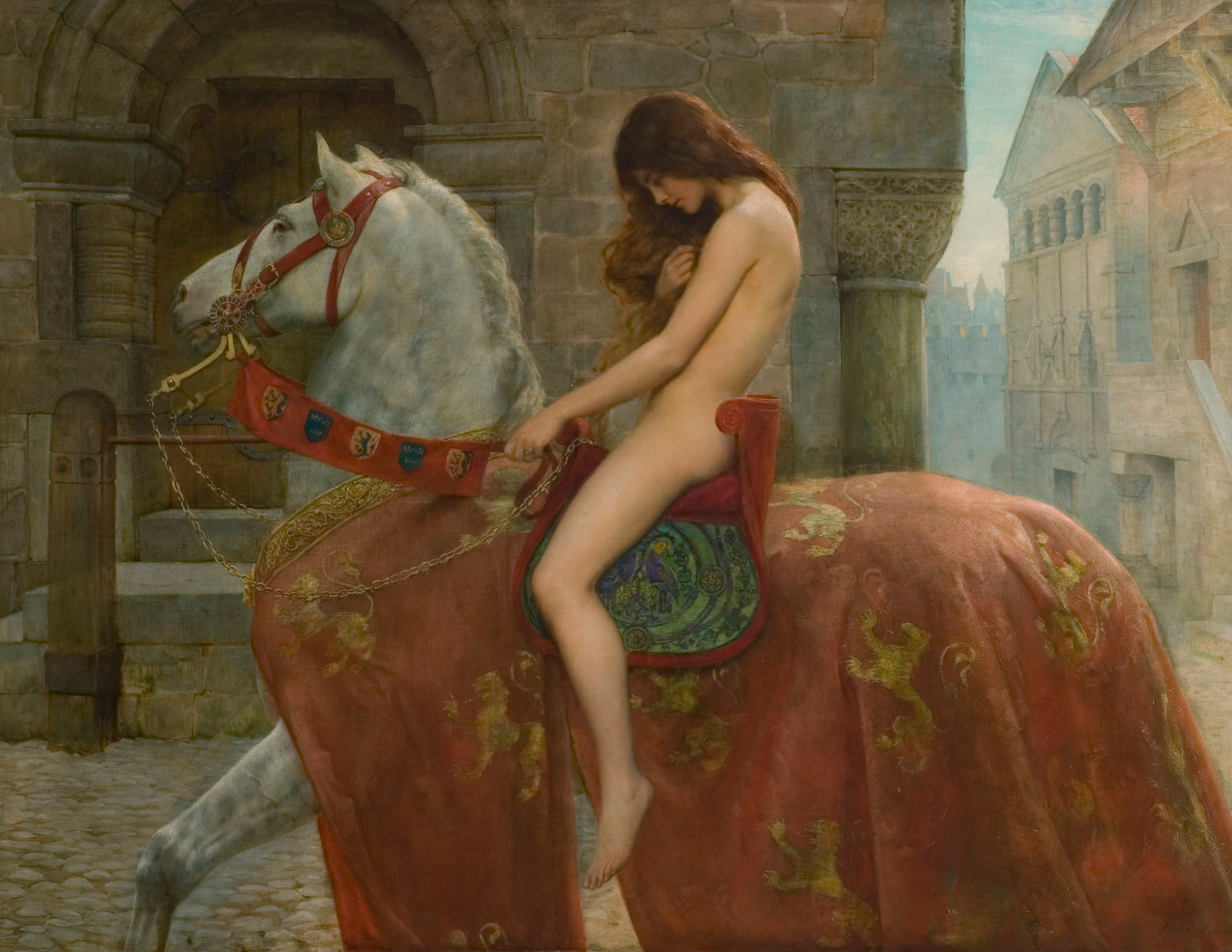
Lady Godiva by John Collier, c. 1897, in the Herbert Art Gallery and Museum, Coventry

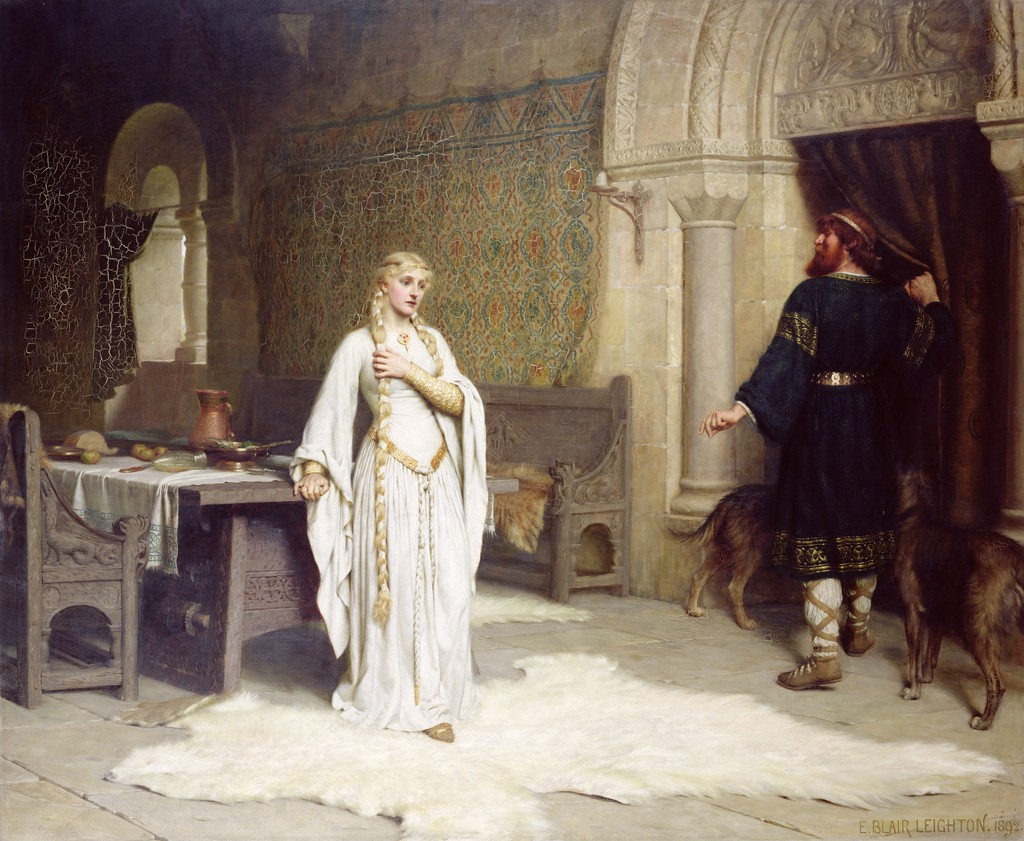
Lady Godiva by Edmund Blair Leighton depicts her moment of decision (1892)

Lady Godiva (/ɡəˈdaɪvə/; died between 1066 and 1086), in Old English Gōdgifu, was a late Anglo-Saxon noblewoman who is relatively well documented as the wife of Leofric, Earl of Mercia, and a patron of various churches and monasteries.

She is mainly remembered for a legend dating back to at least the 13th century, in which she rode naked – covered only by her long hair – through the streets of Coventry to gain a remission of the oppressive taxation that her husband, Leofric, imposed on his tenants. The name "Peeping Tom" for a voyeur originates from later versions of this legend, in which a man named Thomas watched her ride and was struck blind or dead.

== Historical figure ==
Godiva was the wife of Leofric, Earl of Mercia. They had nine children; one son was Ælfgar. Godiva's name occurs in charters and the Domesday Book, though the spelling varies. The Old English name Godgifu or Godgyfu meant "gift of God"; 'Godiva' was the name's Latinised form. Since the name was a popular one, there are contemporaries of the same name.

Some sources claim that Godiva was born in Bucknall, Lincolnshire, around 995 AD—but several historians believe the charter used as evidence for this is spurious.

A woman named Godiva is recorded in the Liber Eliensis, a 12th-century history of Ely Abbey. If that "Godiva" were the same person as [the legendary figure] 'Lady Godiva', then she would have been a widow when Leofric married her. Both Leofric and Godiva were generous benefactors to religious houses. In 1043, Leofric founded and endowed a Benedictine monastery at Coventry on the site of a nunnery destroyed by the Danes in 1016. Writing in the 13th century, Roger of Wendover credits Godiva as the persuasive force behind this act of generosity. In the 1050s, her name is coupled with that of her husband on a grant of land to the monastery of St Mary, Worcester, and the endowment of the minster at Stow St Mary, Lincolnshire. (Note: In the Stow charter, Godiva is called "Godgife".) She and her husband are commemorated as benefactors of other monasteries at Leominster, Chester, Much Wenlock, and Evesham. She gave Coventry a number of works in precious metal by the goldsmith Mannig, and bequeathed a necklace valued at 100 marks of silver. Another necklace went to Evesham, to be hung around the figure of the Virgin Mary accompanying the life-size gold and silver rood she and her husband had donated, and St Paul's Cathedral in the City of London received a gold-fringed chasuble. Godiva and her husband were among the most munificent of the several large Anglo-Saxon donors of the last decades before the Norman Conquest. The early Norman bishops made short work of their gifts, carrying them off to Normandy or melting them down for bullion. Nevertheless, the memory of Godiva and Leofric survived during the Norman reign, and in 1122, their names are commemorated in the mortuary roll of Vitalis of Savigny.

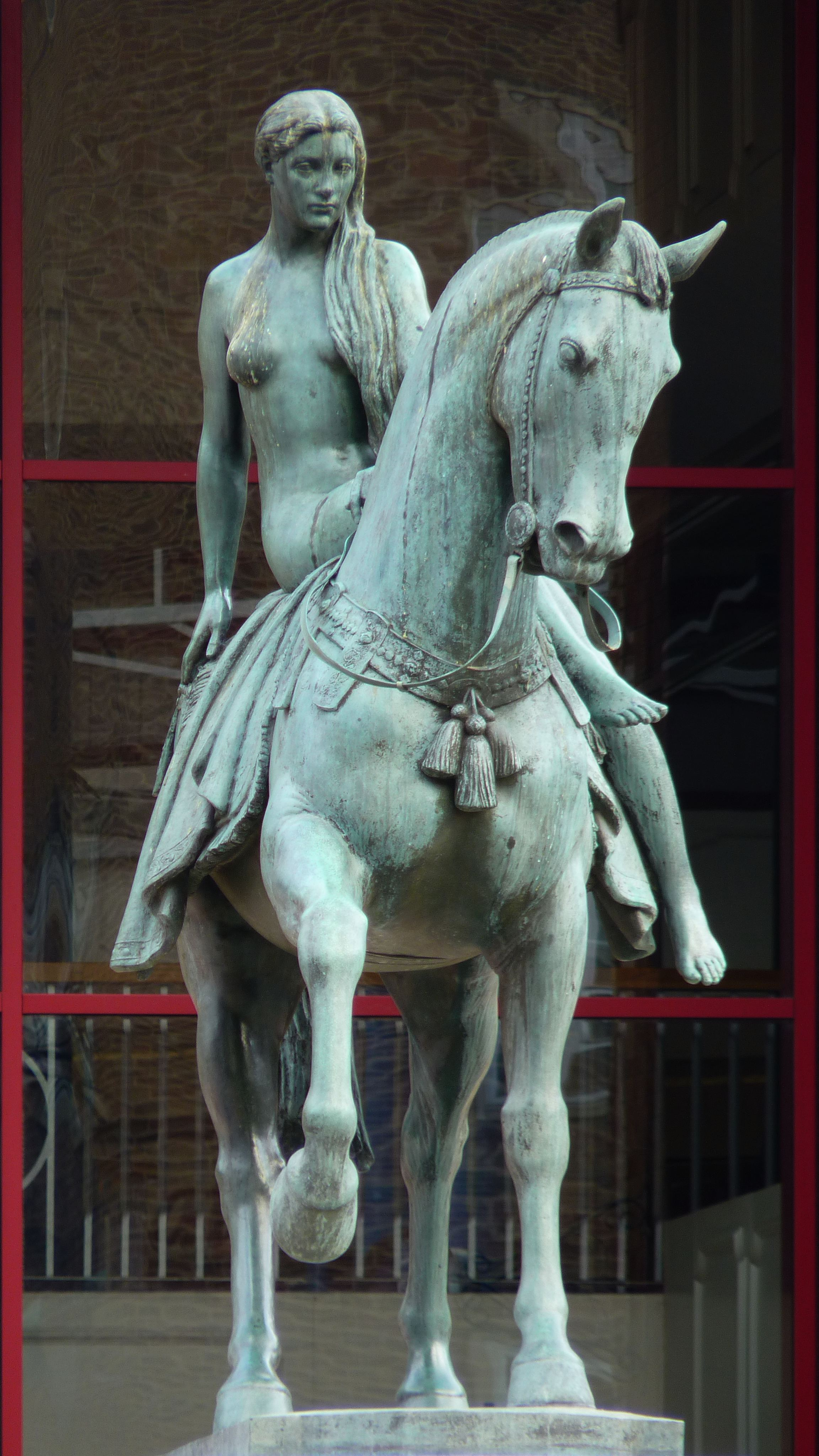
Self Sacrifice, a statue of Godiva by Sir William Reid Dick unveiled in 1949 in Broadgate, Coventry, a £20,000 gift from W. H. Bassett-Green, a Coventrian. (pictured in 2011)

The manor of Woolhope in Herefordshire, along with four others, was given to the cathedral at Hereford before the Norman Conquest by the benefactresses Wulviva and Godiva—usually held to be the Godiva of legend and her sister. The church there has a 20th-century stained glass window representing them.

Her signature, Ego Godiva Comitissa diu istud desideravi ("I, The Countess Godiva, have desired this for a long time"), appears on a charter purportedly given by Thorold of Bucknall to the Benedictine monastery of Spalding. However, this charter is considered spurious by many historians. Even so, it is possible that Thorold, who appears in the Domesday Book as sheriff of Lincolnshire, was her brother. (Note: See Lucy of Bolingbroke.)

After Leofric's death in 1057, his widow lived on until her mid-fifties, and died sometime between the Norman Conquest of 1066 and 1086. She is mentioned in the Domesday Book as one of the few Anglo-Saxons and the only woman to remain a major landholder shortly after the conquest. By the time of this great survey in 1086, Godiva had died and her former lands are listed as held by others.

Godiva's burial place is a matter of debate. According to the Chronicon Abbatiae de Evesham, or Evesham Chronicle, she was buried at the Church of the Blessed Trinity at Evesham, which is no longer standing. According to the account in the Oxford Dictionary of National Biography, "There is no reason to doubt that she was buried with her husband at Coventry, despite the assertion of the Evesham chronicle that she lay in Holy Trinity, Evesham." Her husband was buried in the monastery of St Mary (later Coventry Cathedral) in 1057.

According to William of Malmesbury's Gesta Pontificum Anglorum (Deeds of the English Bishops), Godiva directed in her will that a "circlet of precious stones which she had threaded on a cord in order that by fingering them one after another she might count her prayers exactly, were to be placed on a statue of the Blessed Virgin Mary," the oldest known textual reference to the use of a rosary-like string of prayer beads.

William Dugdale (1656) stated that a window with representations of Leofric and Godiva was placed in Holy Trinity Church, Coventry, about the time of Richard II.

== Legend ==
A record of the legend of the nude ride first appears in the 13th century, in the Flores Historiarum and an adaptation of it by Roger of Wendover. Despite its considerable age, modern historians don't consider it plausible, nor do any known sources mention it in the two centuries after Godiva's death, whereas her generous donations to the church receive various mentions.

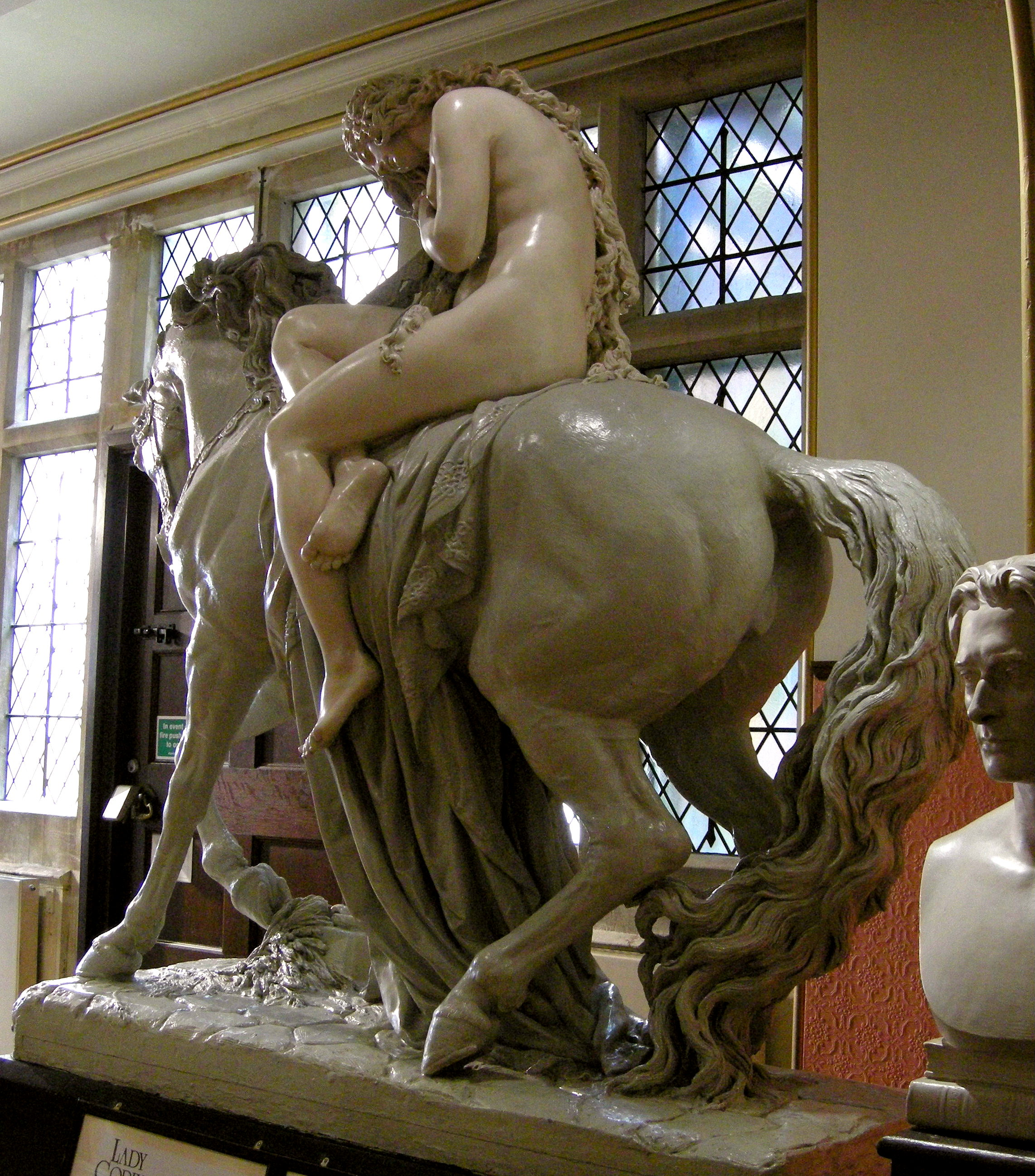
19th-century equestrian statue of the legendary ride, by John Thomas, Maidstone Museum, Kent

According to the typical version of the story, Lady Godiva took pity on the people of Coventry, who were suffering grievously under her husband's oppressive taxation. Lady Godiva appealed again and again to her husband, who obstinately refused to lower the taxes. At last, weary of her repeated requests, he said he would grant her request if she would strip naked and ride on a horse through the streets of the town. Lady Godiva took him at his word, and after issuing a proclamation that all persons should stay indoors and shut their windows, she rode through the town, clothed only in her long hair. Just one person in the town, a tailor ever afterwards known as 'Peeping Tom', disobeyed her proclamation in what is the most famous instance of voyeurism. In most versions of the story, Tom is struck blind or dead for his transgression.

Some historians discern elements of pagan fertility rituals in the Godiva story, whereby a young "May Queen" was led to the sacred Cofa's tree, perhaps to celebrate the renewal of spring. The oldest form of the legend has Godiva passing through Coventry market from one end to the other while the people were assembled, attended only by two knights. This version is given in Flores Historiarum by Roger of Wendover (died 1236), a somewhat gullible collector of anecdotes. In a chronicle written in the 1560s, Richard Grafton claimed the version given in Flores Historiarum originated from a "lost chronicle" written between 1216 and 1235 by the Prior of the monastery of Coventry.

A modified version of the story was given by printer Richard Grafton, later elected MP for Coventry. According to his Chronicle of England (1569), "Leofricus" had already exempted the people of Coventry from "any maner of Tolle, Except onely of Horses", so that Godiva ("Godina" in text) had agreed to the naked ride just to win relief for this horse tax. And as a condition, she required the officials of Coventry to forbid the populace "upon a great pain" from watching her, and to shut themselves in and shutter all windows on the day of her ride. Grafton was an ardent Protestant and sanitized the earlier story.

The ballad "Leoffricus" in the Percy Folio (c. 1650) (Note: A variant of this ballad can be found in the Collection of Old Ballads (1723–25).) conforms to Grafton's version, saying that Lady Godiva performed her ride to remove the customs paid on horses, and that the town's officers ordered the townsfolk to "shutt their dore, & clap their windowes downe," and remain indoors on the day of her ride. (Note: DNB 1890 thus was inaccurate in stating that "This ballad first mention the order..", since Grafton had printed it earlier.)

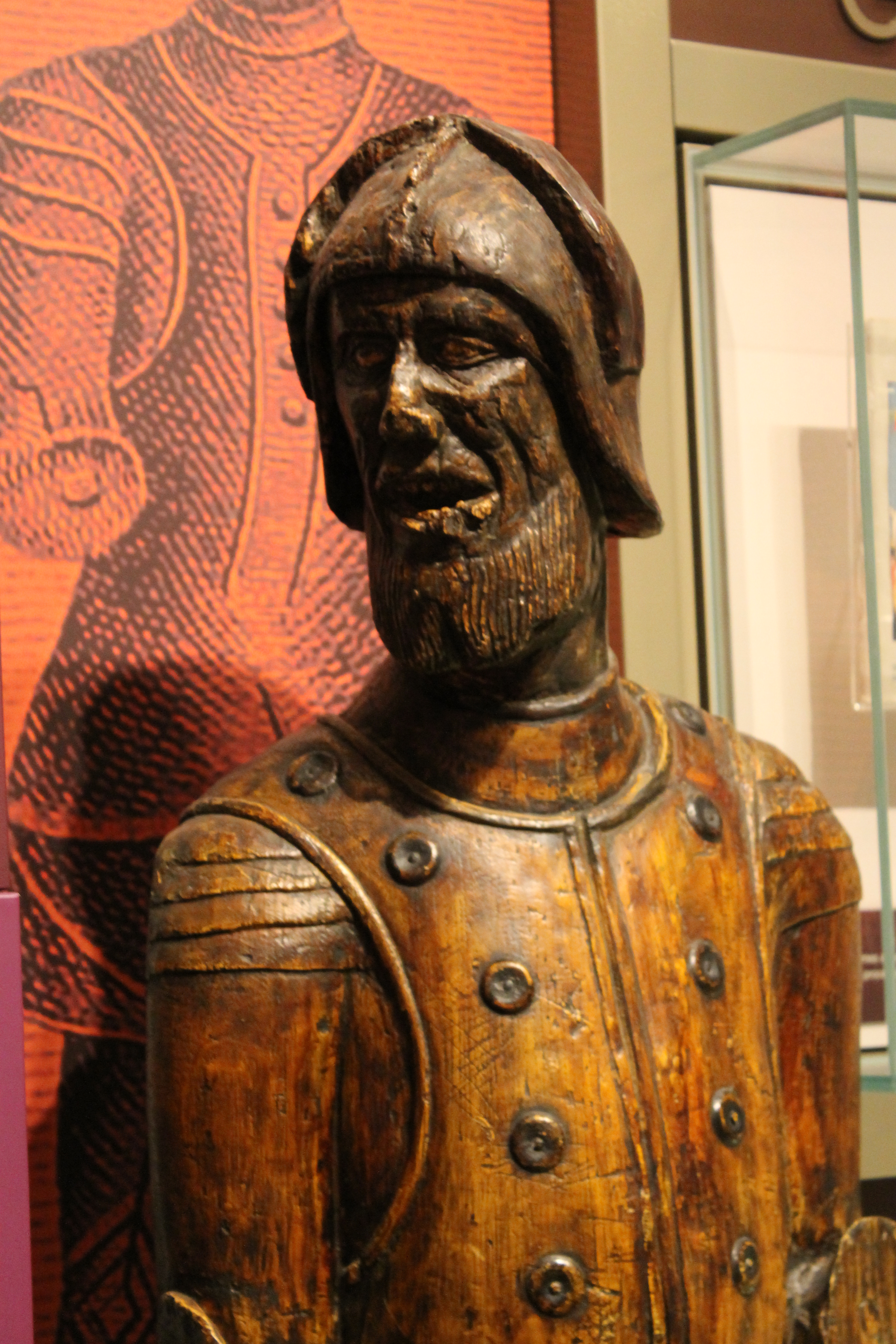
A replica of a medieval sculpture of Peeping Tom, on display at Herbert Art Gallery and Museum

=== Peeping Tom ===
The story of Peeping Tom, who alone among the townsfolk spied on the Lady Godiva's naked ride, probably did not originate in literature, but came about through popular lore in the locality of Coventry. Reference by 17th-century chroniclers has been claimed, but all the published accounts are 18th century or later.

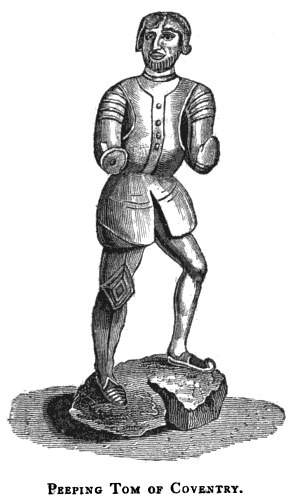
Wooden statue of Peeping Tom exhibited for the Coventry parade. Sketch by W. Reader (from an 1826 article)

According to an 1826 article, submitted by someone well versed in local history and identifying himself as 'W. Reader', there was already a well-established tradition that a certain tailor had spied on Lady Godiva, and that at the annual Trinity Great Fair (now called the Godiva Festival) featuring the Godiva processions an oak statue he described as "a grotesque figure called Peeping Tom" was displayed. The author has dated this effigy, based on the style of armour he is wearing, from the reign of Charles II (d. 1685). The same writer felt the legend had to be subsequent to William Dugdale (d. 1686), since he made no mention of it in his works that discussed Coventry at full length. (Note: Reader 1826, p. 22 "yet no one, including the late Sir W. Dugdale, even hints at the circumstance in question. We may safely, therefore, appropriate it to the reign of Charles II".) (The story of the tailor and the use of a wooden effigy may be as old as the 17th century, but the effigy may not have always been called "Tom.") (Note: See 1773 date below, and the alternate suggested name "Action".)

W. Reader dates the first Godiva procession to 1677, (Note: Reader 1826, p. 22 "In 1677 ... the Procession at the great Fair was first instituted.") but other sources date the first parade to 1678, and on that year, a lad from the household of James Swinnerton enacted the role of Lady Godiva.

The English Dictionary of National Biography (DNB) gives a meticulous account of the literary sources. The historian Paul de Rapin (1732) reported the Coventry lore that Lady Godiva performed her ride while "commanding all Persons to keep within Doors and from their Windows, on pain of Death", but that one man could not refrain from looking and it "cost him his life"; Rapin further reported that the town commemorates this with a "Statue of a Man looking out of a Window."

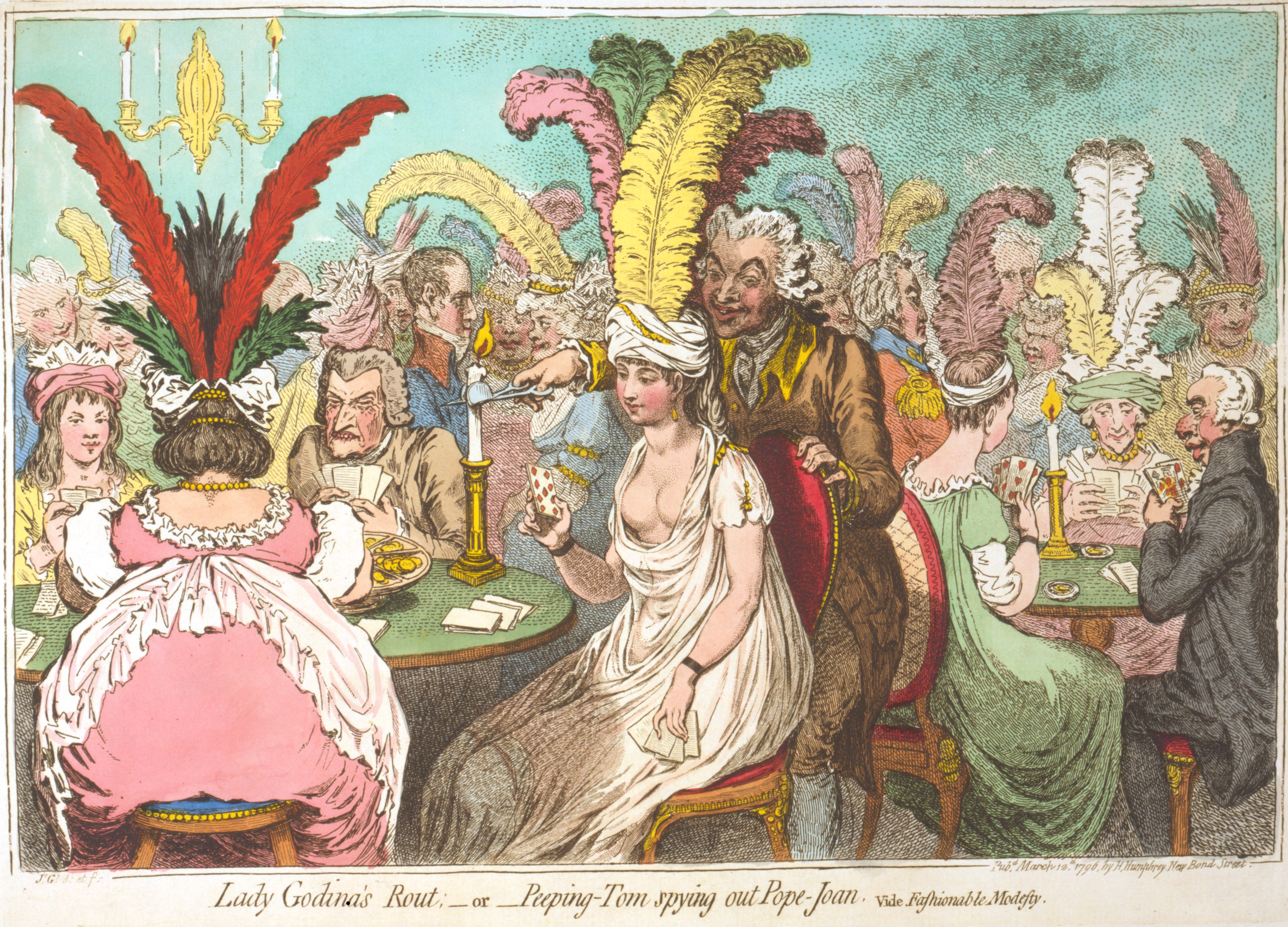
In Lady Godina's Rout;—or—Peeping-Tom spying out Pope-Joan (1796), the English satirist James Gillray appealled to the Godiva legend in caricaturing the fashions of the time.

Next, Thomas Pennant in Journey from Chester to London (1782) recounted: "[T]he curiosity of a certain taylor overcoming his fear, he took a single peep". Pennant noted that the person enacting Godiva in the procession was not fully naked, of course, but wore "silk, closely fitted to her limbs", which had a colour resembling the skin's complexion. (In Pennant's time, around 1782, silk was worn, but the annotator of the 1811 edition noted that a cotton garment had since replaced the silk fabric.) According to the DNB, the oldest document that mentions "Peeping Tom" by name is a record in Coventry's official annals, dating to 11 June 1773, documenting that the city issued a new wig and paint for the wooden effigy.

There is also said to be a letter from pre-1700, stating that the peeper was actually Action, Lady Godiva's groom. (Note: DNB 1890, "Poole quotes from the 'Gentleman's Magazine' a letter from Canon Seward (ca. before 1700) which makes the peeper 'a groom of the countess,' named Action (?Actæon – same name as the figure in Greek mythology who was put to death by being hunted with hounds after seeing the goddess Artemis in her bath)".)

Additional legend proclaims that Peeping Tom was later struck blind as heavenly punishment, or that the townspeople took the matter in their own hands and blinded him.

== Degree of nudity ==
While most iterations of the legend describe Godiva riding completely nude, there is much dispute as to the historical authenticity of this notion.

A more plausible rationale for the legend includes one based on the custom at the time for penitents to make a public procession in their shift, a sleeveless white garment similar to a modern slip and one which was certainly considered "underwear" in Godiva's time. If this were the case, Godiva might have actually travelled through town as a penitent in her shift, likely unshod and stripped of her jewellery which was the hallmark of her upper-class rank. It would have been highly unusual to see a noblewoman present herself publicly in such an unadorned state, possibly bringing about the legend which would later be romanticised in folk history. Her 'naked' ride has also been considered to provide an insight into how women used their sensuality and bodies to wield power in 12th-century England, as well as how her protest formed Coventry's civic identity.

Some suggest that the nudity myth originated in Puritan propaganda, designed to blacken the reputation of the notably pious Lady Godiva. Chroniclers of the 11th and 12th centuries mention Godiva as a respectable religious woman of some beauty and do not allude to nude excursions in public. Some also argue that the story of the pious Lady Godiva was made up to attract pilgrims, and therefore, revenue, to Coventry.

== Images in art and society ==
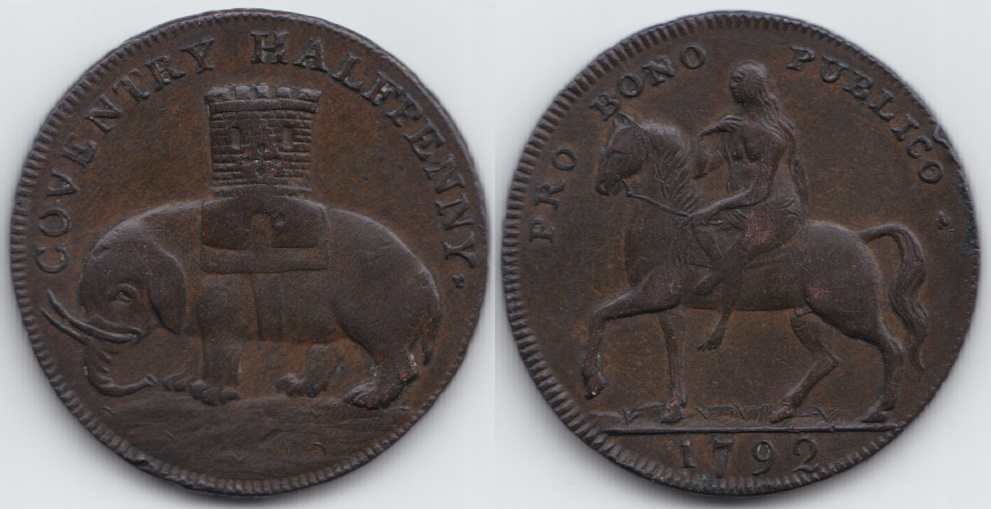
Coventry 1792 halfpenny Conder token with Lady Godiva (right) depicted on the reverse

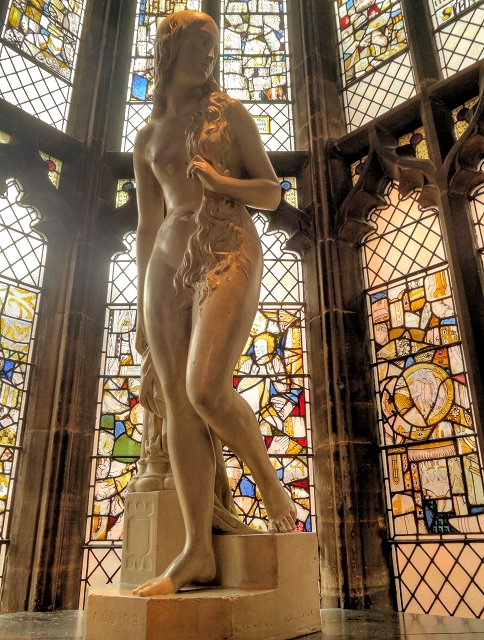
Statue at St Mary's Guildhall in Coventry by William Calder Marshall

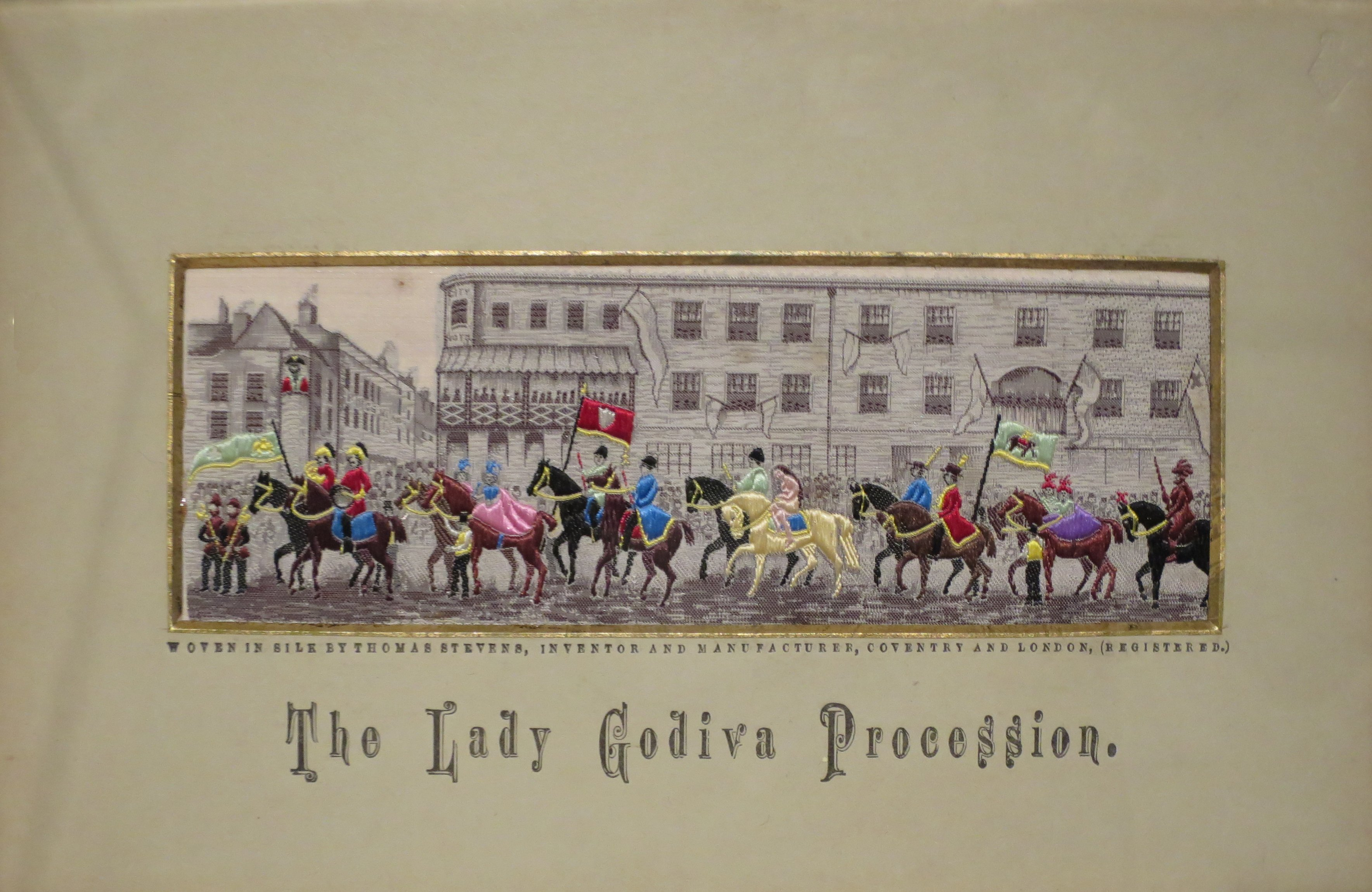
Stevengraph woven silk picture The Lady Godiva Procession (1887), produced by Coventry weaver and inventor Thomas Stevens

The Herbert Art Gallery and Museum in Coventry maintains a permanent exhibition on the subject. The oldest painting was commissioned by the County of the City of Coventry in 1586 and produced by Adam van Noort, a refugee Flemish artist. His painting depicts a "voluptuously displayed" Lady Godiva against the background of a "fantastical Italianate Coventry". In addition, the Gallery has collected many Victorian interpretations of the subject described by Marina Warner as "an oddly composed Landseer, a swooning Watts and a sumptuous Alfred Woolmer". The collection also includes paintings by the Coventry artist David Gee, such as The Godiva Procession Leaving St Mary's Hall.

A 14th-century window depicting Lady Godiva and her husband once existed in Holy Trinity Church, Coventry but was removed in 1775. It bore the inscription, "I Luriche for the love of thee Doe make Coventre tol-free".

In 1792, Lady Godiva was depicted on the reverse of a Coventry halfpenny Conder token—a privately minted token coinage struck and used in Britain during the late 18th century and the early part of the 19th century (a period of the Industrial Revolution). Thomas Stevens, the 19th-century Coventry-born weaver, famous for his innovation of the woven silk pictures known as stevengraphs, sold an image of the Lady Godiva Procession amongst his designs. Another medium used to depict Godiva was linocut printing, with Haydn Reynolds Mackey's early 20th-century work held in the collection of the Royal Academy of Arts in London.

John Collier's painting Lady Godiva (1897) was bequeathed by social reformer Thomas Hancock Nunn. When he died in 1937, the Pre-Raphaelite-style painting was offered to the Corporation of Hampstead. He specified in his will that should his bequest be refused by Hampstead (presumably on grounds of propriety) the painting was then to be offered to Coventry. The painting hangs in the Herbert Art Gallery and Museum.

St Mary's Guildhall in Coventry houses a marble nude statue by William Calder Marshall of Lady Godiva, which was exhibited at the Royal Academy in 1854. American sculptor Anne Whitney also created a marble sculpture of Lady Godiva, in the collection of the Dallas Museum of Art, Dallas, Texas, and another sculpture of Lady Godiva by stonemason John Thomas is held at the Maidstone Museum, Kent.

=== Coventry ===
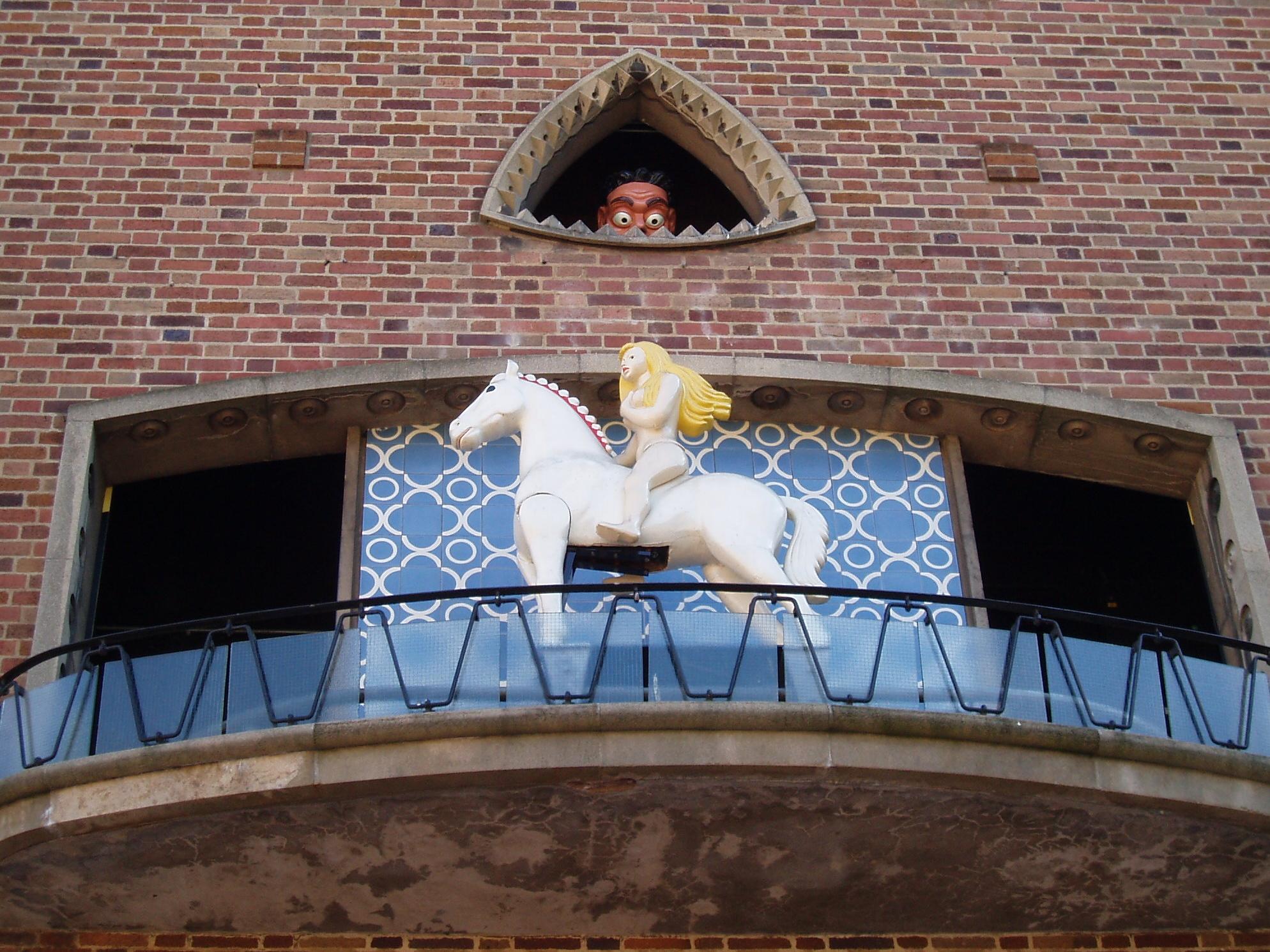
Installed in 1953, the Lady Godiva Clock in Coventry displays her naked ride through the city and Peeping Tom's voyeurism

The Godiva Procession, a commemoration of the legendary ride, was instituted on 31 May 1678 as part of Coventry fair and was celebrated up to the 1960s. The part of Lady Godiva was usually played by a scantily clad actress or dancer, and the occasion often attracted controversy. For instance, in 1854, the Bishop of Worcester protested against "a Birmingham whore being paraded through the streets as Lady Godiva." These annual processions were enlivened by constant rumours beforehand that the girl playing the part of Lady Godiva would actually appear nude, like the original. These hopes were eventually realised in a play staged in 1974, at the Belgrade Theatre in Coventry, entitled The Only True Story of Lady Godiva, in which Lady Godiva appeared naked, riding a motorcycle.

The wooden effigy of Peeping Tom which, from 1812 until World War II, looked out on the world from a hotel at the northwest corner of Hertford Street, Coventry, can be found in Cathedral Lanes Shopping Centre. It represents a man in armour and was probably an image of Saint George. Nearby, in the post-war rebuilt Broadgate, an animated Peeping Tom watches over Lady Godiva as she makes her hourly ride around the Godiva Clock.

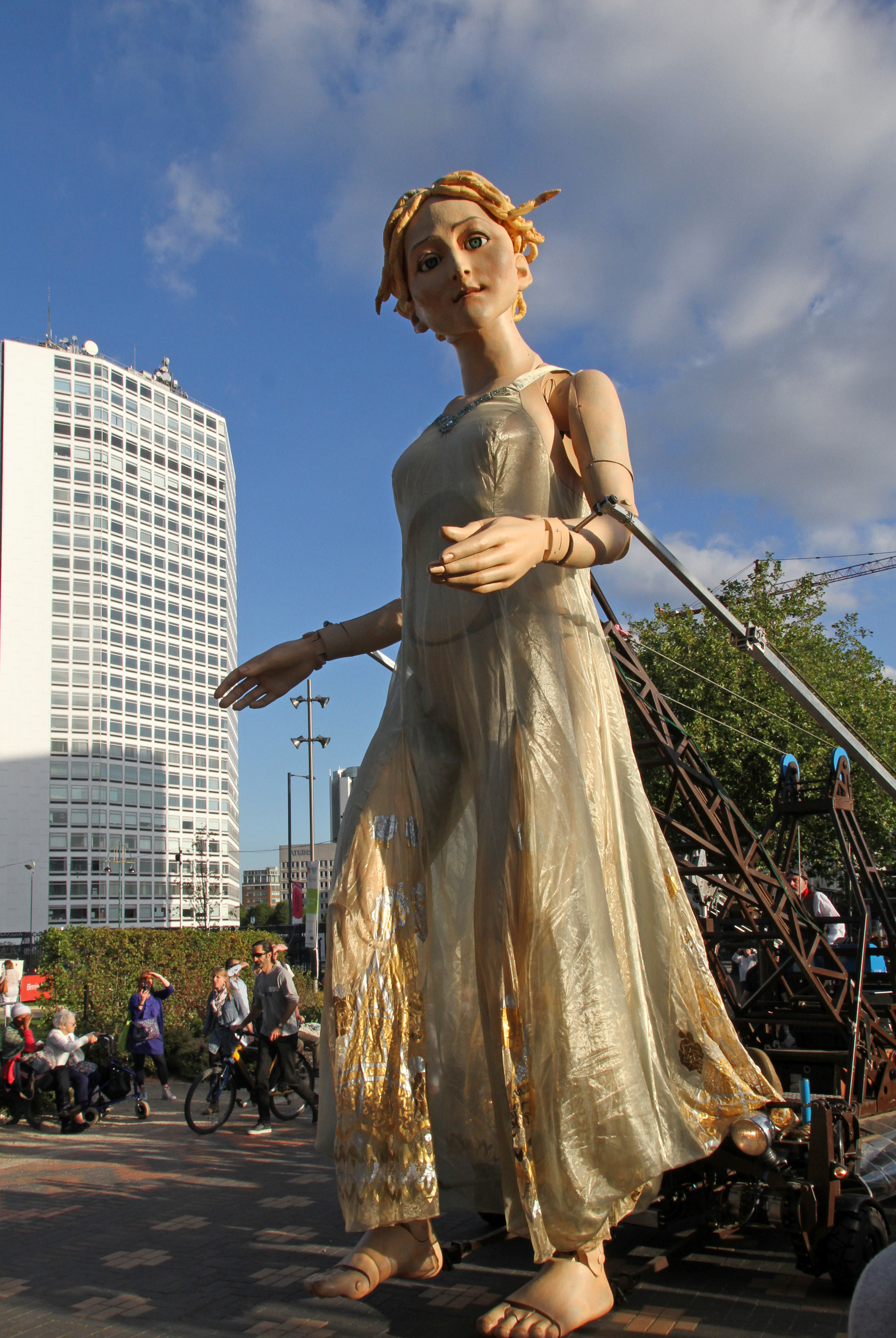
Giant puppet of Lady Godiva walking through the streets of Coventry in September 2015

From the mid-1980s, a Coventry resident, Pru Porretta, has adopted a Lady Godiva role to promote community events and good works in the city. Porretta retains the status of Coventry's unofficial ambassador. Each September, Poretta marks the occasion of Lady Godiva's birthday by leading a local pageant focusing on world peace and unity known as The Godiva Sisters. In August 2007, the Godiva Sisters was performed in front of 900 delegates from 69 countries attending the World Council for Gifted and Talented Children Biennial Conference held at the University of Warwick. In the 2010 New Year Honours, Porretta was appointed MBE "for services to the city of Coventry community and tourism services".

In 1999, Coventry councillors considered eliminating Godiva from the city's public identity; however, the Coventry City Council logo unveiled in 2000 features Lady Godiva and her horse. The previous logo also featured Godiva.

In 2010, an arts project, "Godiva Awakes", involving a 32-foot (10-metres)-tall puppet version of Lady Godiva, powered by 50 bicycles, leading a procession from Coventry to London, was proposed by the independent company Imagineer Productions (best known locally for reviving the Coventry Mystery Plays and reimagining the Coventry Carnival as the Godiva Festival).

=== Literature ===
- "Godiva" (1842), a poem by Alfred, Lord Tennyson.
- "Guli" ("The Heart"), a poem by Galaktion Tabidze, includes a mention of Lady Godiva.
- The Seven Lady Godivas: The True Facts Concerning History's Barest Family (1939), a short illustrated novel by Dr. Seuss.
- Lady Godiva and Master Tom, a 1948 novel by Raoul Cohen Faure.
- Godiva: A Novel, by Nicole Galland, a 2013 historic novel.
- Naked: A Novel of Lady Godiva, by Eliza Redgold, a 2015 romantic novel based on Godiva's life.
- Lady Godiva’s Birthday Suit by Aaron Ashmore, a 2021 children's book.

=== Classical music and opera ===
- Vítězslav Novák composed a concert overture called Lady Godiva based on the story (Prague, 1907; Op. 41).

=== Modern music ===
- The 1966 Peter and Gordon song "Lady Godiva" reimagines the Lady Godiva legend in the modern day.
- The 1968 Velvet Underground song "Lady Godiva's Operation" tells the story of a transitional operation turned into a botched lobotomy.
- The 1978 Queen song "Don't Stop Me Now" mentions Lady Godiva with the line "I'm a racing car, passing by like Lady Godiva".
- The 2013 Heaven Shall Burn song "Godiva" from their album Veto, with the album also featuring an image of Lady Godiva on the cover.

=== Film ===
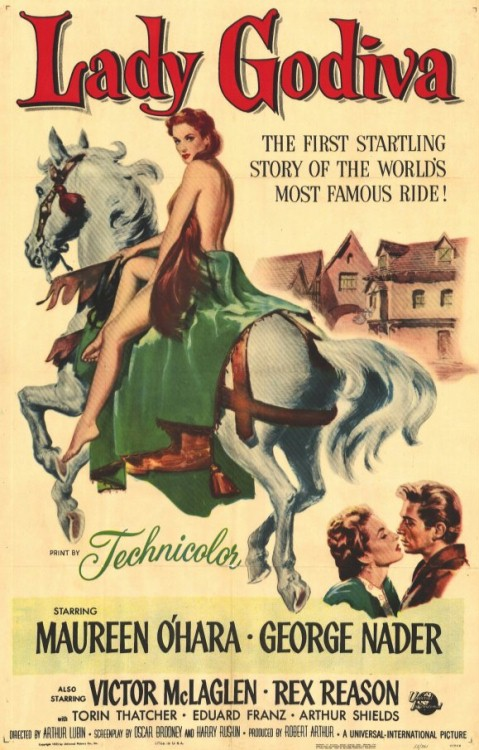
Lady Godiva of Coventry film poster

- Lady Godiva (1911), silent short film by Vitagraph Studios with Julia Swayne Gordon as Lady Godiva.
- Lady Godiva (1921), a German silent drama film starring Hedda Vernon as Lady Godiva.
- The Lady Godiva (1928), silent short film based on Tennyson's poem and with Gladys Jennings as Lady Godiva. Also known as Ghosts of Yesterday #1: Lady Godiva.
- Lady Godiva Rides Again (1950), British comedy film with Diana Dors and Pauline Stroud. Titled Bikini Baby in the United States.
- Lady Godiva of Coventry (1955), starring Irish actress Maureen O'Hara in the title role.
- Lady Godiva Rides (1968), comedy starring Marsha Jordan, directed by Stephen C. Apostolof.
- Lady Godiva: Back in the Saddle (2007), comedy film.

== Gallery ==
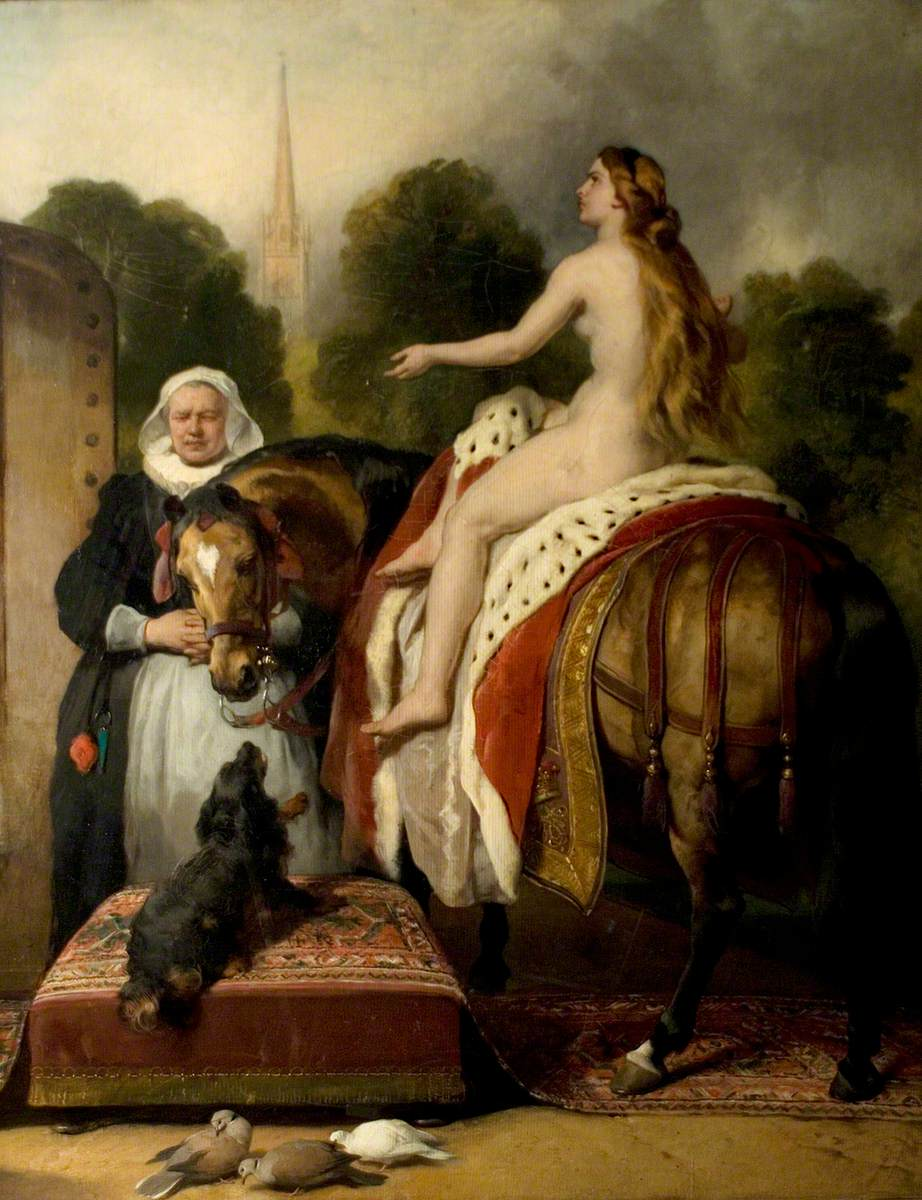
Edwin Landseer, Lady Godiva's Prayer (1865)

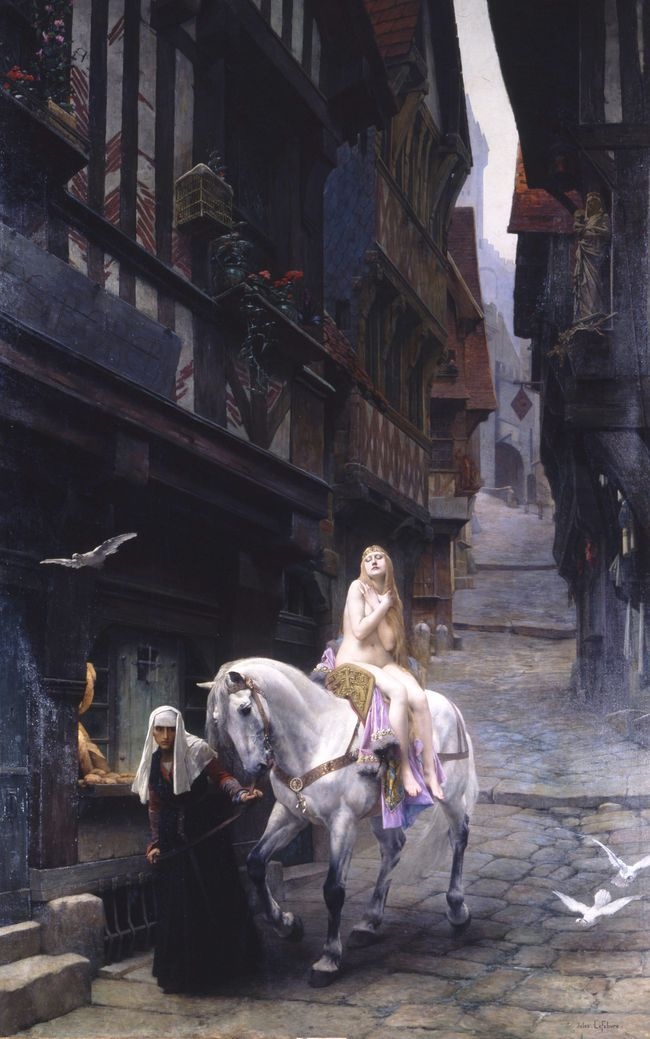
Jules Joseph Lefebvre, Lady Godiva, 1890

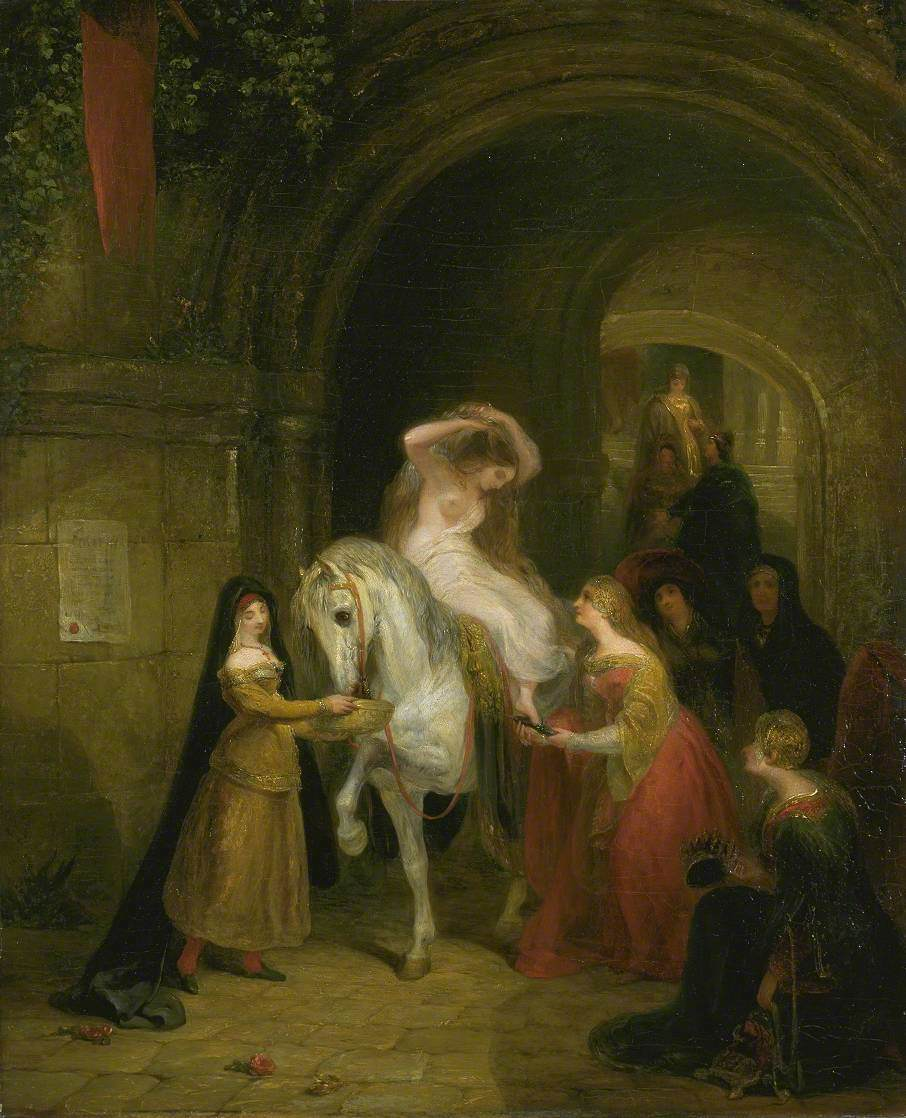
George Jones, Godiva Preparing to Ride through Coventry (1833), at Tate Britain

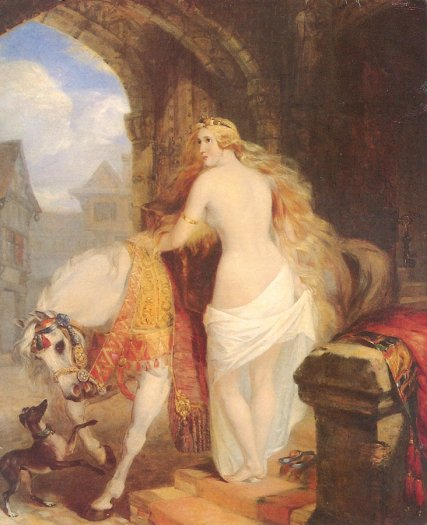
Marshall Claxton, Lady Godiva (1850), at the Herbert Art Gallery and Museum, Coventry

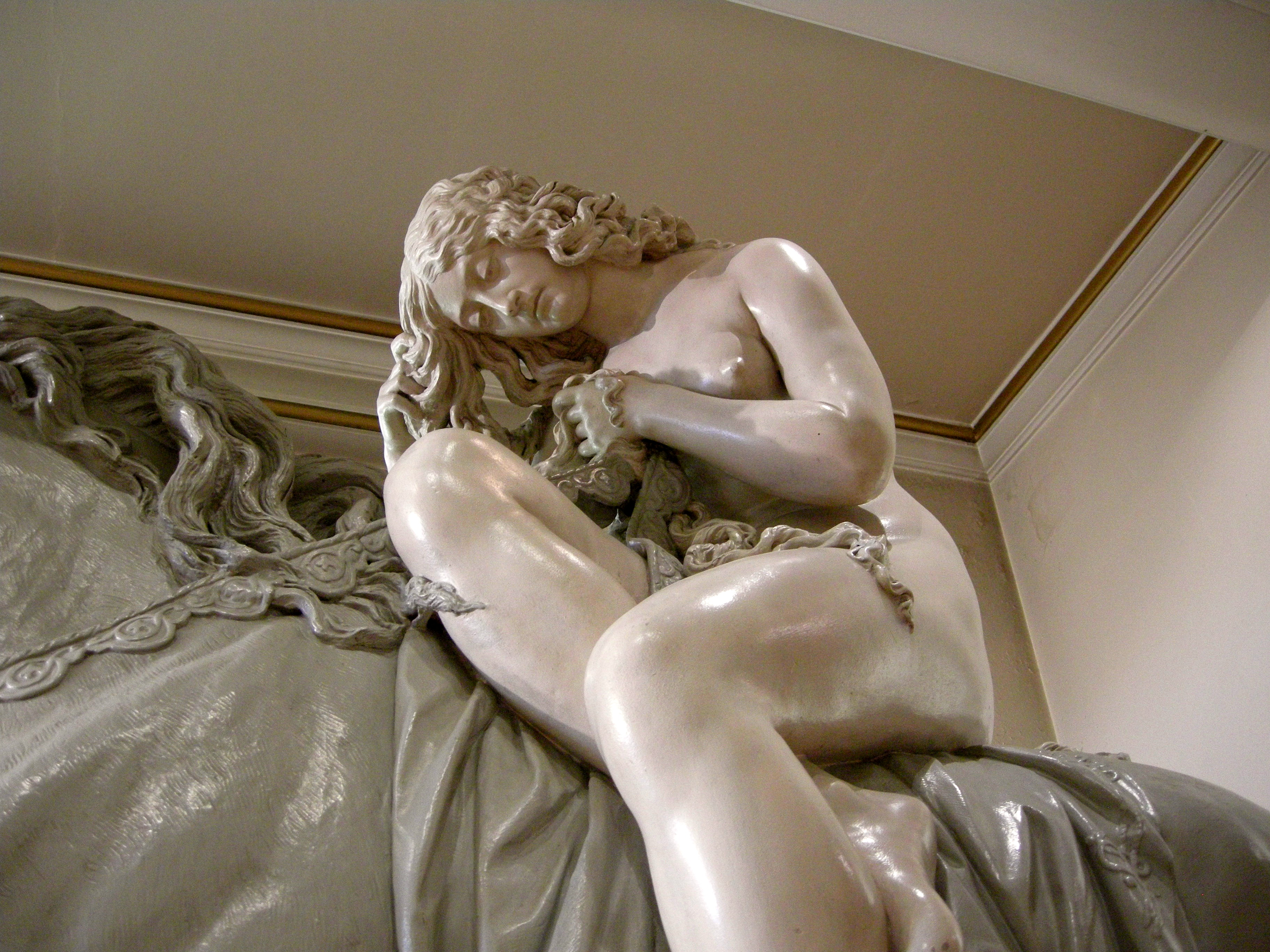
John Thomas, Lady Godiva at Maidstone Museum

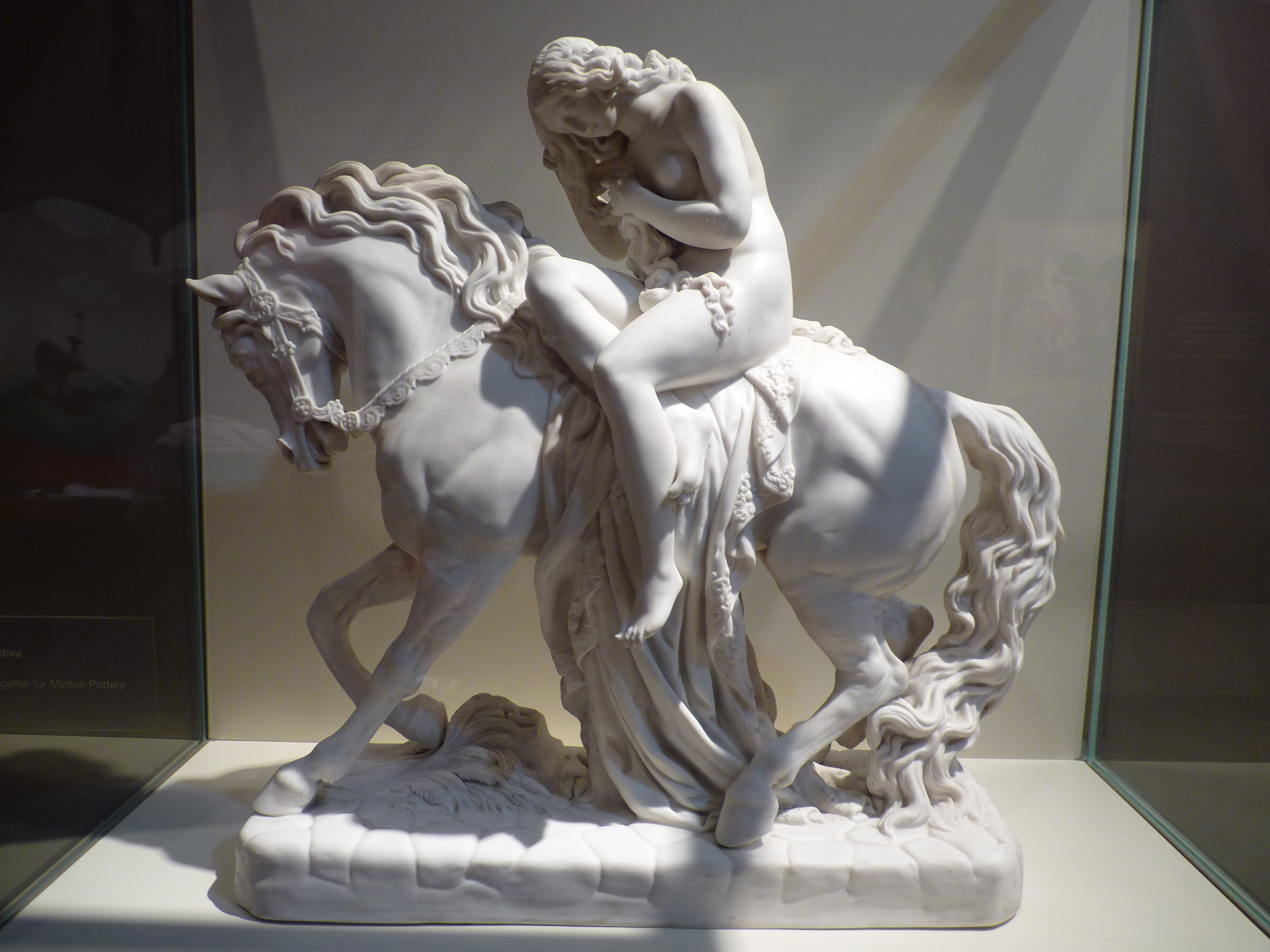
Lady Godiva at the Herbert Art Gallery and Museum, Coventry

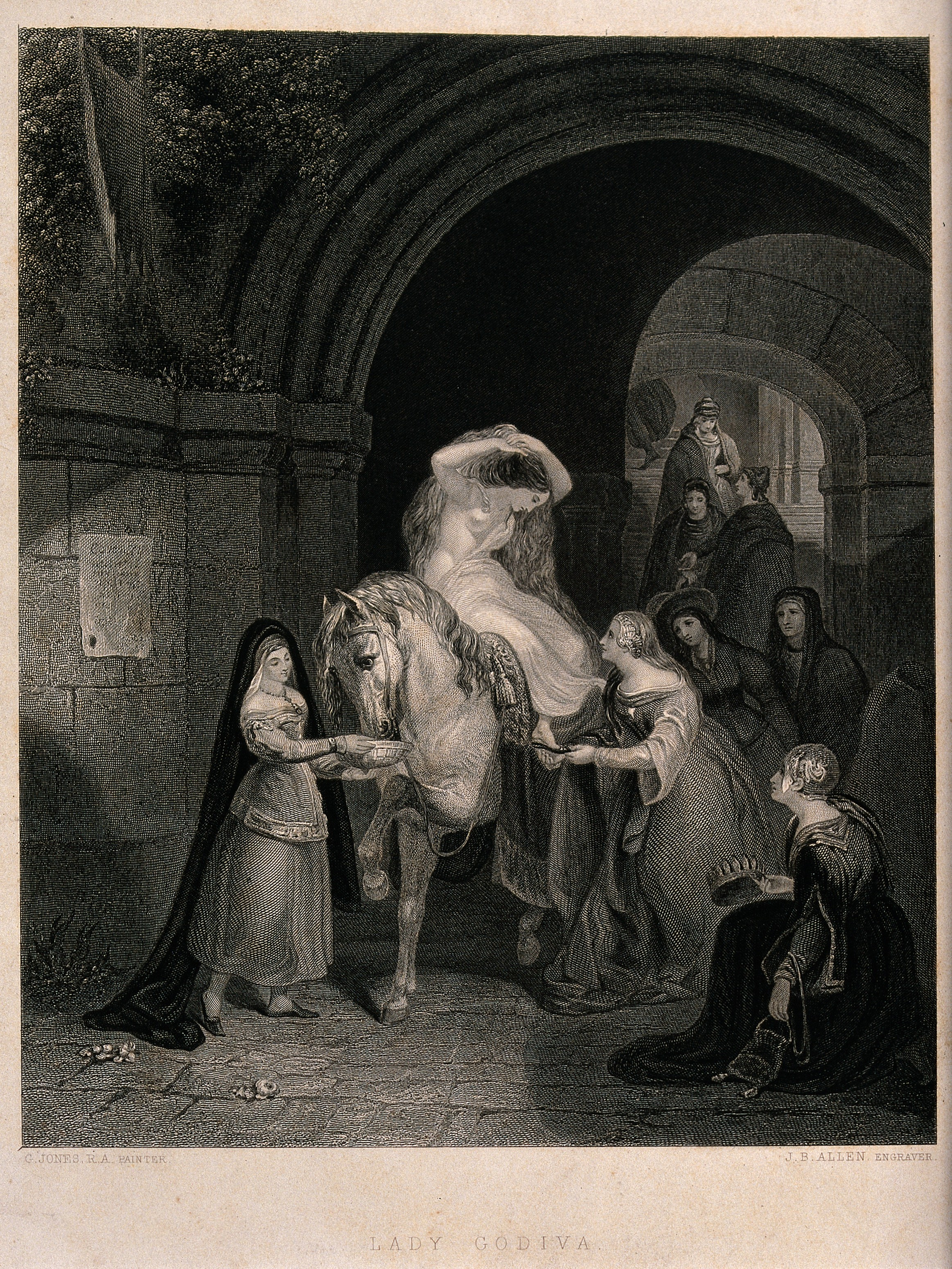
Lady Godiva depicted in her shift. Engraving by J.B. Allen after G. Jones

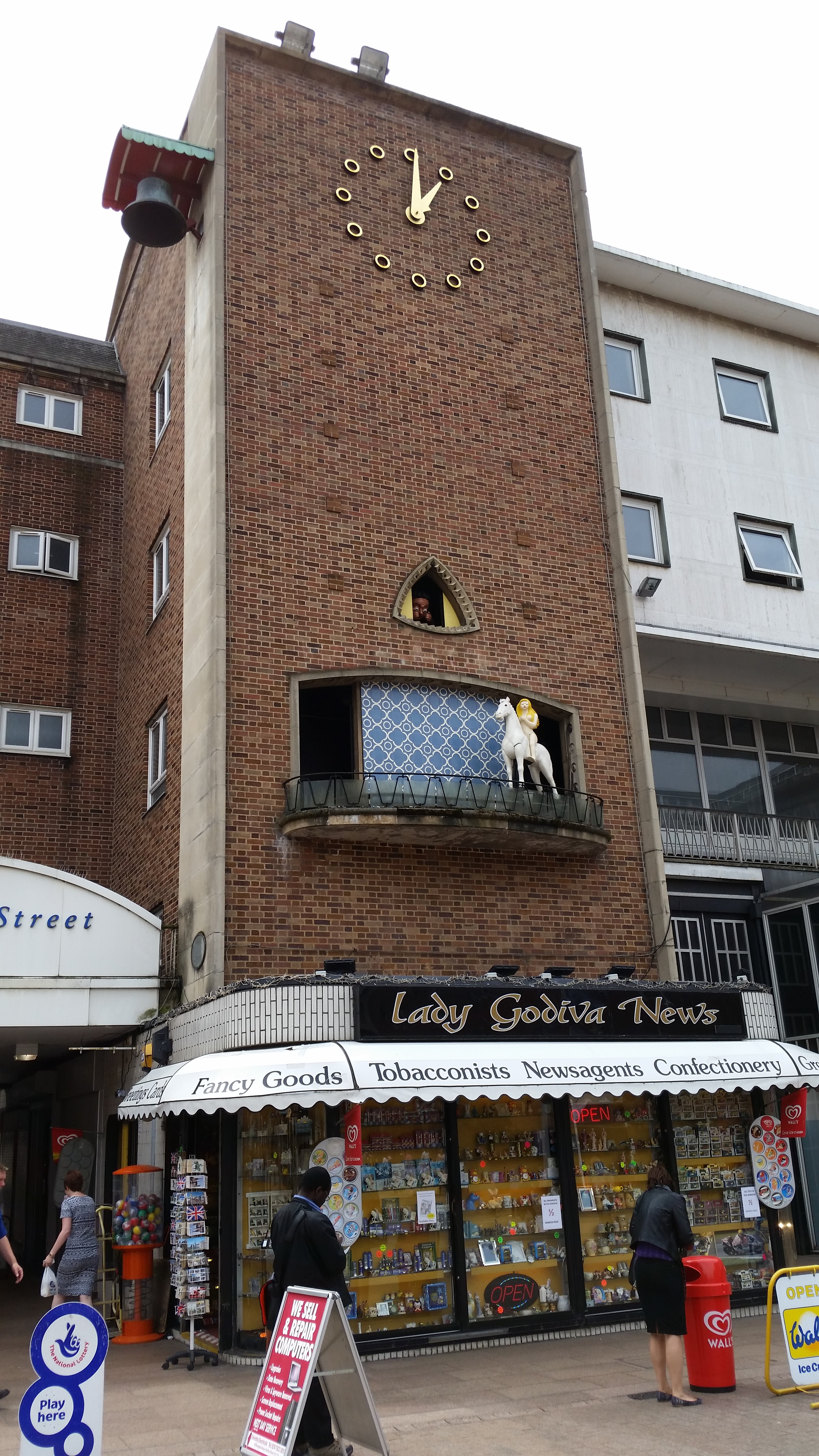
Broadgate Clock, Coventry

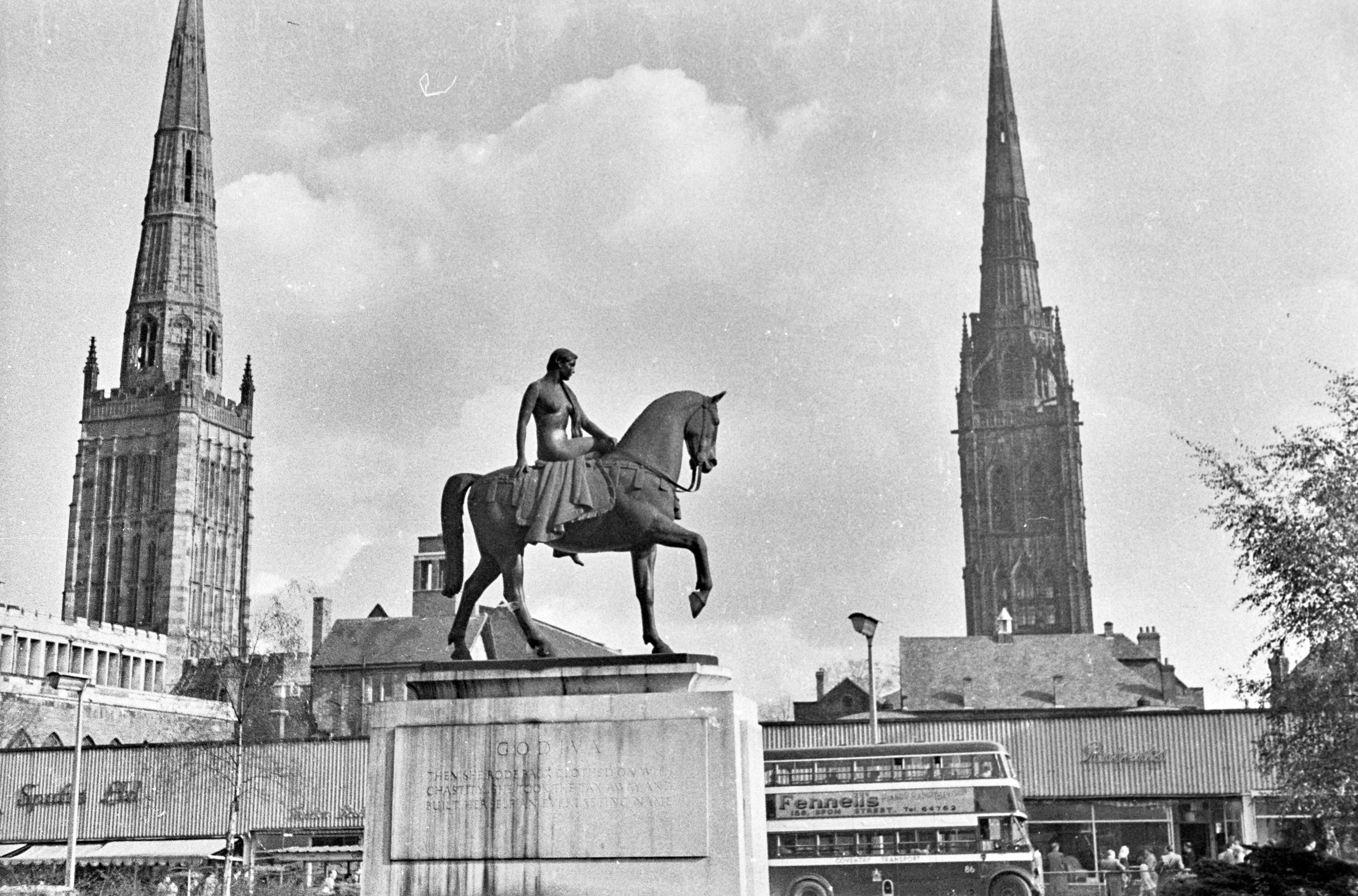
Lady Godiva Statue in Coventry

== See also ==
- Asteroid 3018 Godiva
- Godiva Chocolatier
- Godiva device
- Nudity and protest
- The Seven Lady Godivas
- Lady Godiva, 1897 painting by John Collier
