= London Voluntary Service Council =

British charitable organization

The London Voluntary Service Council was the collaborative leader of Greater London’s voluntary and community sector, supporting some 60,000 voluntary, community and social enterprise organisations. It is a registered charity number 276886.

== History ==
In 1907 the Council of Social Service was founded by social reformer Thomas Hancock Nunn. In 1910 the Social Welfare Association for London was inaugurated with support from the Lord Mayor of London Sir John Knill and the Chairman of the London County Council Sir Melvill Beachcroft. Its aim was to "secure systematic co-operation between social, charitable and industrial undertakings throughout the metropolis, and the establishment of councils of social welfare in every metropolitan borough to give effect to these objects". In 1919 the Association changed its name to the London Council of Social Service (LCSS). This was an advice organisation that provided advice for local councils of social service and coordinated links between voluntary organisations and local authorities. From 1979 it has been known as the London Voluntary Service Council (LVSC). In 2007 its CEO was Elizabeth Balgobin. In 2013 it merged with United Way Worldwide to become United Way London, but returned to its own branding in 2016.

The LVSC entered voluntary liquidation on 31 October 2017. In the statement on the LVSC website, the charity's board said: "After 107 years supporting London's thousands of civil society organisations so they can meet the needs of our communities, LVSC has transferred its remaining functions over to GLV [Greater London Volunteering] in preparation for the establishment of a hub for London.
