= Elizabeth Balgobin =

British charity leader

- Born: 24 April 1965; Skeldon, Guiana, United Kingdom
- Died: March 8, 2024 (aged 58)
- Occupation: Charity leader

Elizabeth Balgobin (24 April 1965 – 8 March 2024) was a British charity governance specialist, who held multiple senior roles in voluntary sector organisations throughout her career. She was chief executive officer of Blackliners, the UK's first organisation for Black people affected by HIV and AIDS. Posthumously, she was named an honorary trustee of the National Emergencies Trust to recognise her contributions to its success.

== Career ==
Balgobin's career in the charity sector began inadvertently volunteering for Amnesty International. Her first paid role was for the housing association Clarion. For the last 20 years of her career she held a range of senior roles: she was chief executive officer of Blackliners, the UK's first organisation for Black people affected by HIV and AIDS. In 2007, she was CEO of London Voluntary Service Council. She was the founding chairperson at Voice4Change England and had worked as a grant officer at BBC Children in Need. She was a former Head of Equality, Diversity & Inclusion at the Chartered Institute of Fundraising. She was a trustee of National Emergencies Trust, and was also a life coach. At the time of her death, she was CEO of the Bowlby Centre, a mental health charity. She died on 8 March 2024. Posthumously, she was named an honorary trustee of the National Emergencies Trust to recognise her contributions to its success.

== Personal life ==
Balgobin had experienced homelessness as child, and survived a teenage suicide attempt.
