= Chartered Institute of Fundraising =

UK professional body

- Formation: 1983; 43 years ago
- Type: Charitable organisation
- Headquarters: Borough, London
- Region served: United Kingdom
- Members: 4.827 (2023)
- Chair of Trustees: Harpreet Kondel
- Chief Executive: Katie Docherty
- Revenue: £4.6m (2023)
- Staff: 41 (2023)
- Volunteers: 500 (2023)
- Website: ciof.org.uk
- Formerly called: Institute of Charity Fundraising Managers (1983-2002); Institute of Fundraising (2002-2020)

The Chartered Institute of Fundraising is a registered charity founded in 1983, and is the professional membership body for UK fundraising. The Institute's mission is to support fundraisers through leadership and representation; best practice and compliance; education and networking; and champion and promote fundraising as a career choice.

== History ==
The CIoF was originally called The Institute of Charity Fundraising Managers, changing its name in 2002 to the Institute of Fundraising to reflect the growing profession.

In 2011, the Institute launched the IoF Academy which offers training and qualifications to fundraisers at every stage in their career. The Certificate in Fundraising, once completed, allows members to use the post nominals MCIOF(Cert) (formerly MinstF(Cert)) and upon completion of the Diploma in Fundraising, members can use the post nominals MCIOF(Dip) (formerly MinstF(Dip)).

On 1 April 2020, the Institute of Fundraising received its Royal Charter from the Privy Council and is now the Chartered Institute of Fundraising.

In 2022, the Chartered Institute became the UK lead organisation for the international Giving Tuesday charity awareness campaign.

== Notable people ==
- Elizabeth Balgobin
