= Lady Godiva (1911 film) =

1911 film

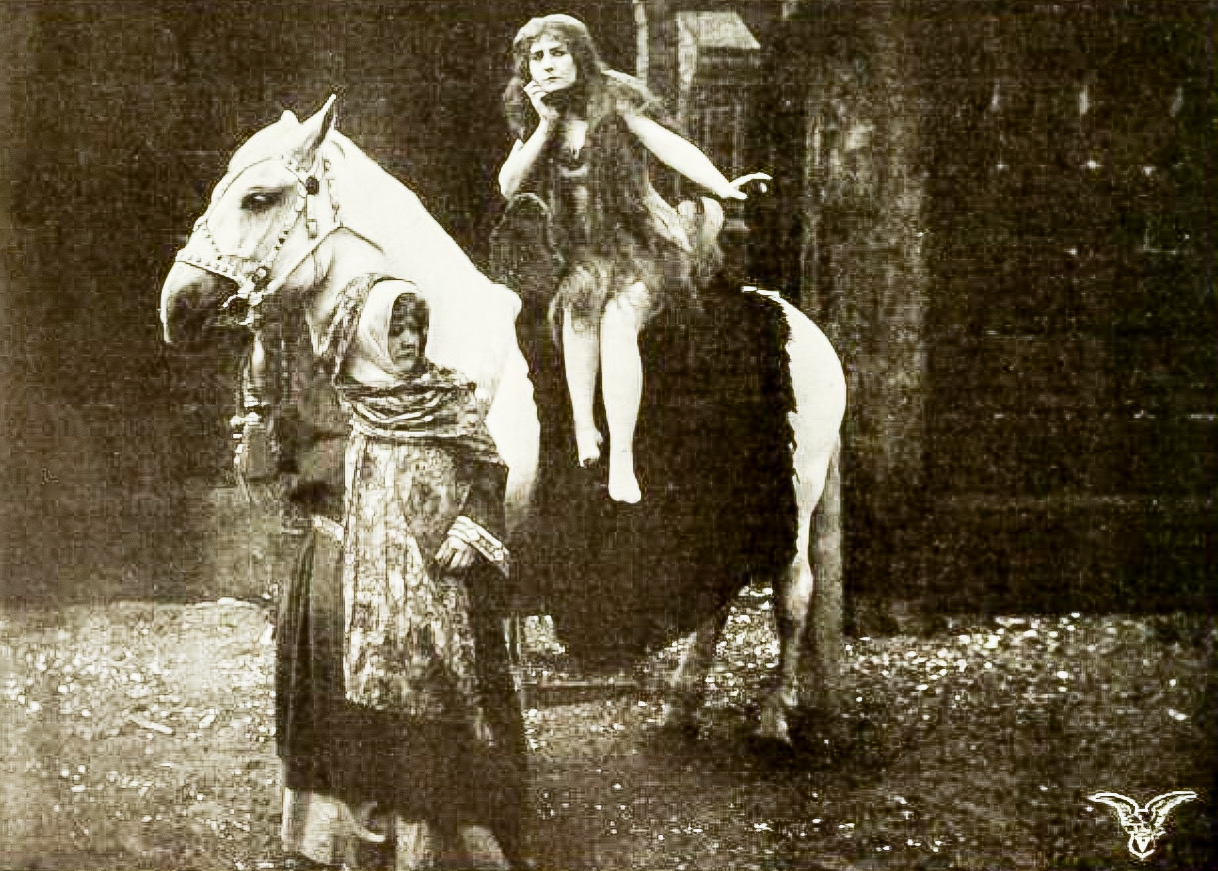
- Godiva (Julia Swayne Gordon) on horse and with servant (Kate Price)
- Directed by: J. Stuart Blackton
- Written by: Scenario by Eugene Mullin, adapted from "Godiva" by Alfred, Lord Tennyson
- Starring: Julia Swayne Gordon
- Production companies: Vitagraph Studios; Brooklyn, New York
- Distributed by: Motion Picture Distributors and Sales Company
- Release date: October 21, 1911
- Running time: 9.5 minutes (approximately 633 feet) (Note: Surviving copies of the film may not be identical in length to the original theatrical release of 1911. If they do reflect the full theatrical cut, their running lengths are far shorter than the "1000 feet" reported by Vitagraph. In fact, every one of 30 Vitagraph films released between September 23 and November 3, 1911—are advertised as productions of 1000 feet. Unlike some other studios, Vitagraph in this period did not report individual lengths of its films; instead, the company used 1000- and 2000-foot measurements to identify its releases simply as one- and two-reelers. The running length of a 9.5-minute film in 1911 measured closer to 633 feet.)
- Country: United States
- Language: Silent (English intertitles)

Lady Godiva is a 1911 American silent historical drama film directed by J. Stuart Blackton and produced by Vitagraph Studios in Brooklyn, New York. Its scenario is based on a legendary incident in the life of Godiva, Countess of Mercia, who lived in England during the mid-11th century. Allegedly, the Anglo-Saxon noblewoman rode naked—covered only by her long hair—through the streets of Coventry to protest and abolish an oppressive tax imposed on that town's residents by her husband, Leofric, Earl of Mercia. The film, copies of which survive today, stars Julia Swayne Gordon in the title role with a supporting cast including Robert Maillard, Harold Wilson, and Kate Price.

== Plot ==
It is the year 1040 in the town of Coventry, England. The local lord, Leofric, has imposed a heavy tax on the residents, many of whom are on the verge of starvation. They appeal for help from the caring noblewoman Lady Godiva, who is the wife of Leofric. On the people's behalf, she pleads with her husband to revoke the tax and relieve their suffering. Leofric, who quickly grows weary of her pleas, decides to test his wife's sincerity and her resolve by promising to rescind the tax if she will ride naked on horseback through the streets of the town. Godiva accepts the condition despite the prospect of such a public humiliation.

Before riding through Coventry, the lady instructs her attendants to post in town a proclamation in which she expresses her love for the people and to end the tax for them she explains, "To save you, I must ride thro' the town unclothed". Her proclamation also asks all residents to support her by remaining "within your homes two hours at mid day", shutting all doors and windows, and adding "Let no eye look out." At the appointed time, Lady Godiva slowly rides through the streets, with only her long hair, extending from her head "to her knee", partially covering her bare body. All the townspeople but one dutifully follow their lady's instructions to stay indoors and to avoid observing her as she passes. Only the town's lecherous tailor, Thomas, cannot resist the temptation to see Godiva fully unclothed. Cutting a small hole into a closed shutter at his house, he peeks at her riding by and is instantly struck blind. Forever after known as "Peeping Tom", the tailor for his transgression suffers divine retribution, resulting in his eyes being "shrivell'd into darkness in his head". Lady Godiva, her task now done, returns home, where her husband honors their agreement and promptly announces to a cheering crowd that he is repealing the hated tax.

== Cast ==
Play film; runtime 00:09:29

- Julia Swayne Gordon as Lady Godiva
- Robert Maillard as Leofric, Earl of Mercia
- Harold Wilson as "Peeping Tom"
- Kate Price as Lady Godiva's attendant
- Clara Kimball Young as Coventry resident praying
- Alfred Hollingsworth as Coventry resident
- James Young as Coventry resident
- Harry Ward as Coventry resident
- Stanley Dunn as Coventry resident

== Production ==
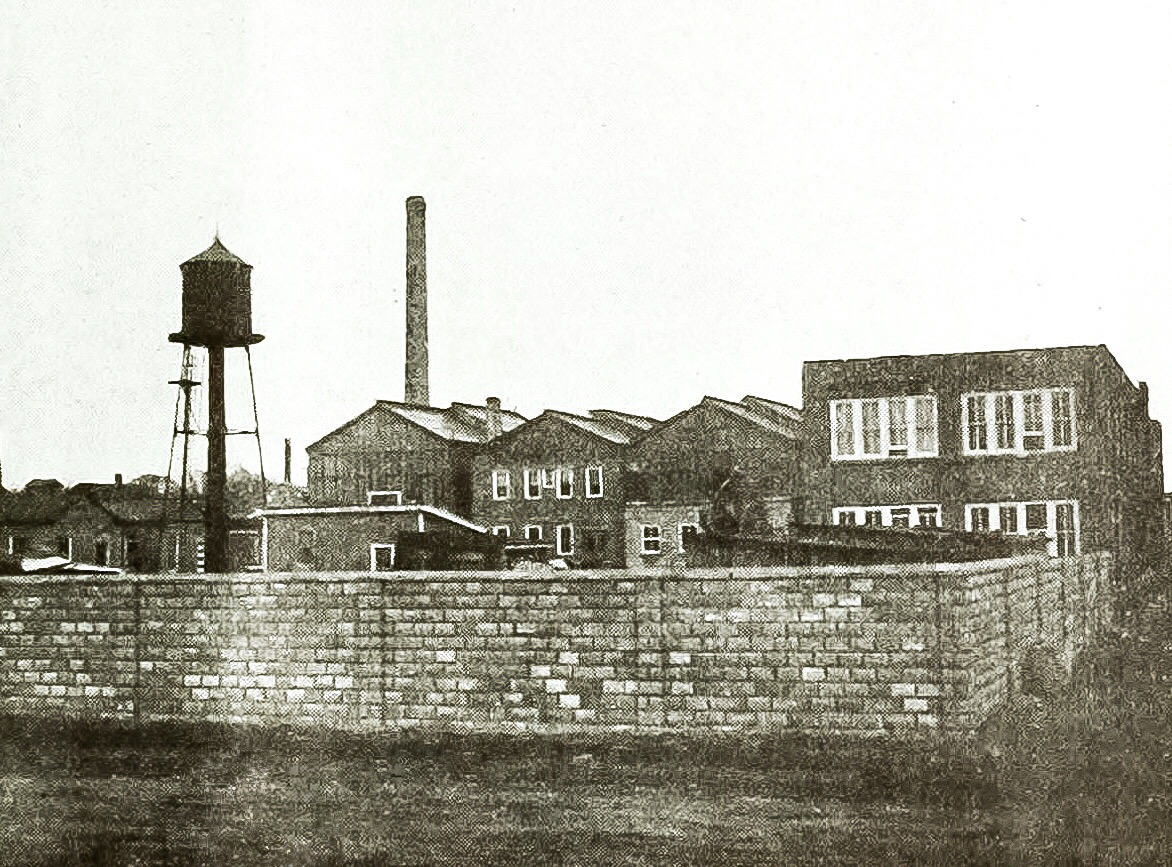
Vitagraph's yard (behind wall) where Lady Godiva was filmed

The film was produced in New York City at Vitagraph's plant and "studio yard" located near the intersection of East 15th Street and Locust Avenue in the Midwood neighborhood of Brooklyn. (Note: Vitagraph by 1911 was regularly completing five films a week at its Brooklyn studio, a breakneck pace in production that Director J. Stuart Blackton likely maintained by shooting Lady Godiva over a day or two in September 1911.) The medieval legend of Lady Godiva, which is the basis of the film, has been cited in historical accounts as early as 1307, more than 250 years after the noblewoman made her famous ride. That event also inspired numerous poetical works over the centuries, including "Godiva" written by British poet Alfred, Lord Tennyson in 1840. Wording in the film's intertitles shows that Vitagraph's version of the legend is clearly adapted from Tennyson's work and even includes terminology and phrasing drawn verbatim from his poem. The film's lead intertitle, for example, states, "'Godiva, wife of that grim Earl, loved the people well And loathed to see them taxed.'" Tennyson's poem refers to "that grim Earl" with "And loathed to see them overtaxe'd". The rest of Vitagraph's intertitles are laced with additional wording from Tennyson, such as "She told him of their tears, And pray'd him", "from a heart as rough as Esau's hand", and "'Ride you naked thro' the town, And I repeal [the tax]'".

As early as mid-July 1911—three months before the film's actual release, the New York-based trade journal The Moving Picture World reported Vitagraph's plans to produce Lady Godiva and predicted it would be a success:

The story of Lady Godiva will be depicted by the Vitagraph Company, who, with its usual good judgement and marvelous facilities, will produce a portrayal that will not only be valuable as a matter of general information and rare attractiveness, but the subject will be extremely picturesque and dazzlingly beautiful in its every detail, introducing to our notice quaint streets, manners, customs and costumes of the people of the eleventh century.

Promotion in 1911 of "the most famous bareback ride in history" relied on the most sensational aspect of the Godiva story: nudity. If, however, some theatergoers hoped to get a glimpse of a nude or even partially clad Julia Swayne Gordon, they were no doubt disappointed. Scenes during the filming of Lady Godiva were carefully choreographed to minimize any screen perspectives that would allow a full and open viewing of Godiva riding through Coventry; and, in any case, Gordon was never nude during her performance; she wore a full neck-to-foot body stocking, one known in the entertainment trade as a "living-picture suit". At the end of the ride, however, Godiva is filmed from behind as she dismounts, giving one momentary view of her bare back, buttocks, and legs.

== Release and reception ==
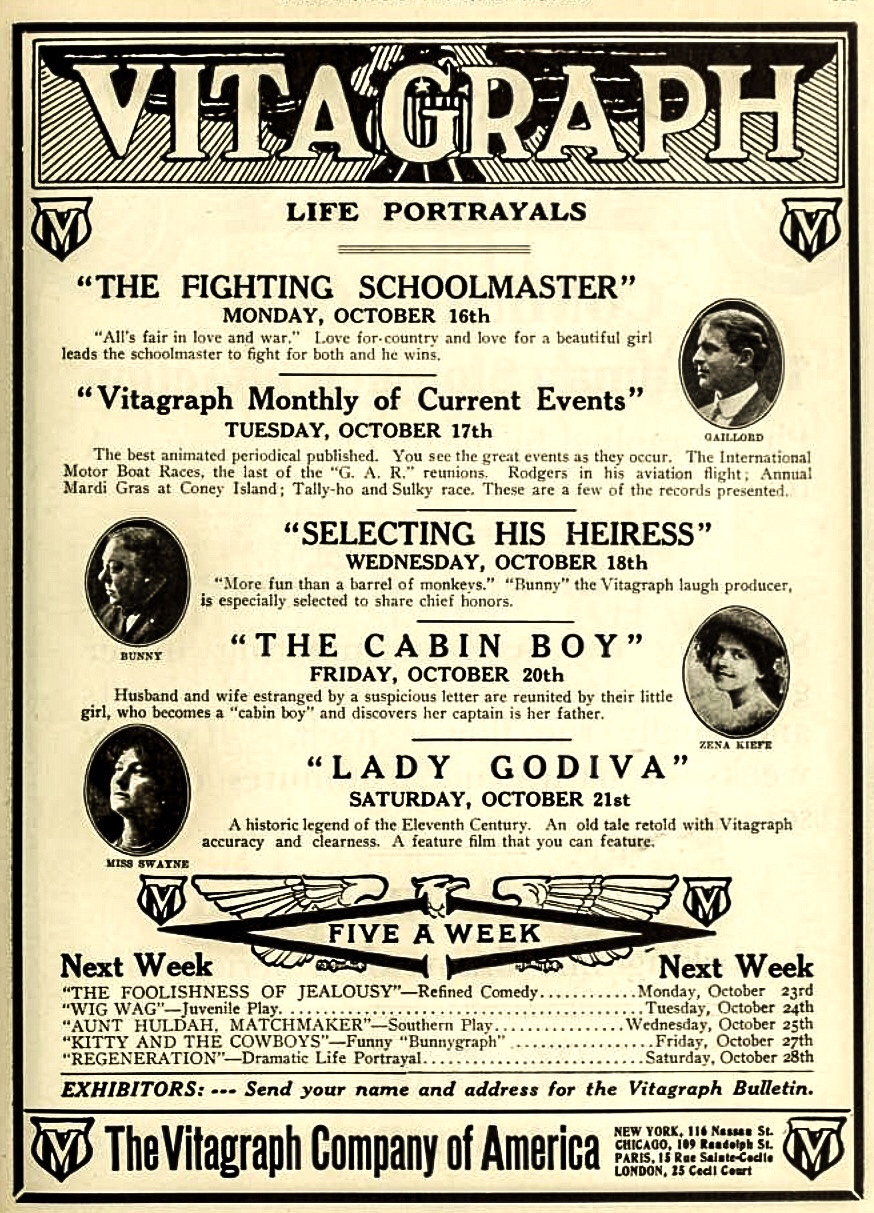
Ten Vitagraph releases, including Lady Godiva, October 16–28, 1911

Vitagraph's decision to release the film in late October may have been linked to an anticipated increase in the public's interest in the historical character Lady Godiva, an interest connected to media coverage of a stage adaptation of her story that would open on Broadway in November 1911. That play, written and directed by British dramatist Louis N. Parker, starred the popular American stage actress Viola Allen and was scheduled to tour the United States for months after its New York premiere.

In both critical reviews and at the box office, the film proved to be successful during the final quarter of 1911. In its November 4 issue, the trade publication The Moving Picture World describes the production as artful in its interpretation of Tennyson's work and emotionally effective in its spiritual tone:

The story of the noble Countess of Coventry, who by riding through the city unclothed saved the people from a grievous tax, is widely known. Tennyson's poem on her sacrifice has furnished the scenario for this picture, which is a very fine piece of art and picture-craft, full of spiritual significance. The impression it makes is distinctly human and tender. The audience seemed to be clearly moved by it.

The film continued to be popular and successful in drawing large audiences. Three weeks after the production's release, the motion-picture reviewer for The Moving Picture News reported that Lady Godiva "drew a packed house at the Lyceum [Theatre]" in Cleveland, Ohio.

== Surviving copies of the film ==
Numerous digitized copies of this film survive, although it is unverified whether any of these extant copies represent the full theatrical cut released by Vitagraph in October 1911. Some copies of Lady Godiva are available on the video-streaming service YouTube, all of which are in the public domain.
