= Lady Godiva (painting) =

Painting by John Collier

- Lady Godiva
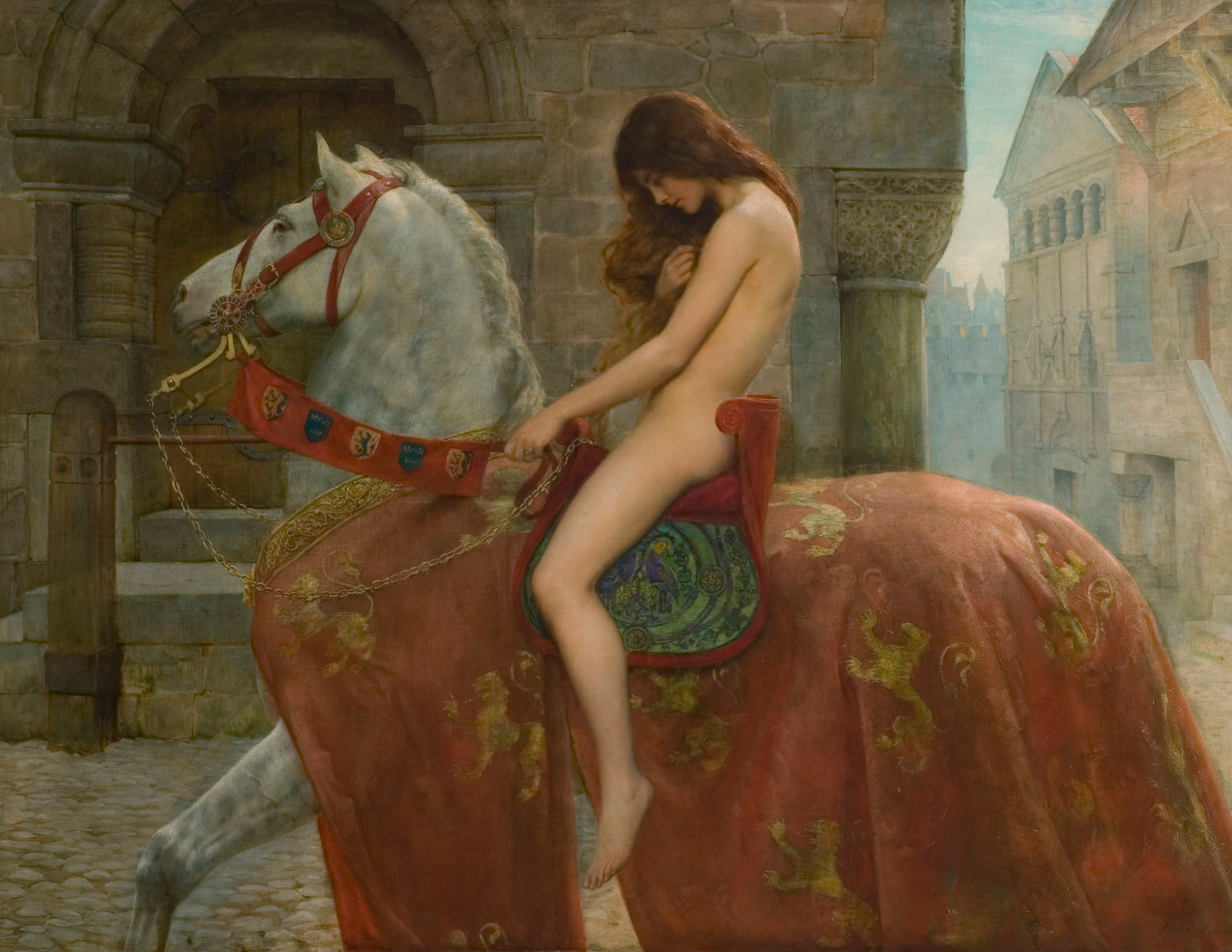
- Artist: John Collier
- Year: 1897
- Medium: Oil painting on canvas
- Dimensions: 142.2 cm (56.0 in) × 183 cm (72 in)
- Location: Herbert Art Gallery and Museum, Coventry
- Accession no.: VA.1974.0048
- Identifiers: Art UK artwork ID: godiva-55279

Lady Godiva is an 1897 oil-on-canvas painting by English artist John Collier, who worked in the style of the Pre-Raphaelite Brotherhood. The portrayal of Lady Godiva and her well-known but apocryphal ride through Coventry, England, is held in Coventry's Herbert Art Gallery and Museum.

Lady Godiva was bequeathed by social reformer Thomas Hancock Nunn. When he died in 1937, the painting was offered to the Corporation of Hampstead. He specified in his will that should his bequest be refused by Hampstead, the painting was then to be offered to Coventry. The model in the painting is Mab (Mabel) Paul (born Mabel Hall in 1882 and likely 14 years old when she posed), an artist model and West End theatre actress who was also painted as herself by John Collier.

== Description ==
The composition of the painting, simple in appearance, depicts a young woman riding a majestic white horse (the color of the equine is deduced to symbolise the chastity, purity and virtue of the woman). The animal is adorned with walking clothes and the gold thread matches the embroidery of the cloak.

Godiva is represented as a beautiful and delicate woman, with certain traits of idealisation in the canon of proportions. Her long brown hair with reddish hues covers the most intimate parts of her body. She blushes and holds her head down in shame for her gesture (in some preparatory sketches her face was turned towards the viewer), although her body seems rested and her shoulders relaxed, as if she knows that no one is looking at her. The only accessory that she wears is the wedding ring on her left hand, the same one with which she holds the reins. The cerulean nude is closely linked to the work of the Pre-Raphaelite painters but also to other romantic currents, achieving a sensation full of intimacy and sensuality.

The background, where soft colours predominate, shows some houses of the Anglo-Saxon feudal urban layout. The door of a Benedictine monastery, the construction of which had been financed by Godiva and her husband, is visible. In the top right corner, a view of the city opens up, with a second background also showing soft colours, where Collier painted perspective, depth and the feeling of space. He used a sort of aerial perspective, as the outlines of the buildings in the distance blur. The painting does not depict Peeping Tom, a tailor who, according to the legend, spied on Godiva and was struck blind.
