= National Emergencies Trust =

UK charity

The National Emergencies Trust is a UK domestic charity launched in 2019 to collaborate with other UK charities during times of disaster. Launched on 7 November 2019, it serves as an equivalent organisation to the Disasters Emergency Committee in England and Wales. The charity's patron is the Prince of Wales, who became its patron in April 2020. The charity's Founding President is Richard Dannatt.

The charity's only appeal was launched in March 2020, during the COVID-19 pandemic, when the Duke of Cambridge appeared in a video for the Trust, launching a fundraising appeal to help charities during the outbreak. The appeal raised £11 million in its first week, with the money going out to "front line charities" and to the UK Community Foundations to be distributed among "local community foundations". The appeal ultimately raised £97 million. Posthumously, Elizabeth Balgobin, a former trustee, was named an Honorary Trustee of the National Emergencies Trust to recognise her contributions to its success during the pandemic.

In June 2020, the UK broadcaster Channel 4 received special permission from FIFA to air the 1966 World Cup in aid of the National Emergencies Trust's Coronavirus Appeal. The match was broadcast as part of a programme titled Final Replay '66, and was presented by Gabby Logan, with commentary from Geoff Hurst and Glenn Hoddle. The match was also livestreamed via All 4.
