= Godiva (album) =

Studio album by Godiva
- Released: September 2003
- Recorded: House of Music, Winterbach, Germany
- Genre: heavy metal
- Length: 44:55
- Label: Limb Music
- Producers: Godiva & Tom Naumann

Godiva chronology
Godiva (2003)	Call Me Under 666 (2005)

Professional ratings
Review scores
Source	Rating
Scream Magazine	5/6 stars

Godiva is the debut album by Godiva, released September 22, 2003. The album is produced by Tom Naumann, who is most famous for his work with Primal Fear.

== Track listing ==
1. "Tha Gate" (Mitch Koontz, Peter Gander) - 1:01
2. "Razorblade Romantic" (Sammy Lasagni, Anthony de Angelis) - 4:37
3. "Heavy Metal Thunder" (Lasagni, de Angelis) - 4:54
4. "One Shot" (Koontz, Tom Naumann, de Angelis) - 4:01
5. "Nightmare" (Lasagni, de Angelis, Koontz, Gander) - 4:53
6. "Cold Blood" (Koontz, Naumann, de Angelis) - 4:30
7. "Where Angels Die" (Naumann, de Angelis) - 4:29
8. "Riding Through Time" (Lasagni, Koontz, Gander) - 5:07
9. "Let the Tanks Roll" (Lasagni, de Angelis) - 4:35
10. "Bullshit Lover" (Koontz, Gander, de Angelis) - 3:03
11. "Sinner" (Koontz, Gander) - 3:45

== Personnel ==
=== Band members ===
- Anthony de Angelis - vocals
- Sammy Lasagni - guitars
- Mitch Koontz - bass, backing vocals
- Peter Gander - drums

=== Additional musicians ===
- Klaus Sperling - drums on "Where Angels Die"
