= Thomas Hancock Nunn =

Thomas Hancock Nunn (1859–1937) was an English social reformer.

He was born on 14 March 1859 in London and admitted to Christ's College, Cambridge in 1880 with no scholarship. He received his B.A. in 1884 and his M.A. in 1904. He was also known as Tom Nunn and was married to Kate Hannah Nunn. His brother John Hancock Nunn was in the India rubber business founded by Thomas Hancock.

Nunn was vice-chair of the Hampstead Charity Organization Society (COS). Soon after the founding of the first university-affiliated institution of the world-wide Settlement movement in 1884 at Toynbee Hall in Whitechapel he made a base for himself there. He resided there from 1884 to 1891, and in 1892 published an article, "The Universities' Settlement in Whitechapel" in The Economic Review which describes why it was established and how well it had meant those aims.

At Hampstead in 1902 he founded the first Council of Social Welfare which brought all welfare agencies together under one administrative umbrella. This was to lay the foundations for the London Council of Social Service. He was a commissioner of the Royal Commission on the Poor Laws and Relief of Distress 1905–09, and in 1909 published a pamphlet A council of social welfare : a note and memorandum in the report of the Royal Commission on the Poor Laws and Relief of Distress.

He died 22 June 1937 at Shoreham-by-Sea. His biography was published in 1942 by H.J.Marshall. A charity bearing his name, the Thomas Hancock Nunn Memorial fund, operated from 1962 to 1991.
