= Godiva (poem) =

Poem by Tennyson

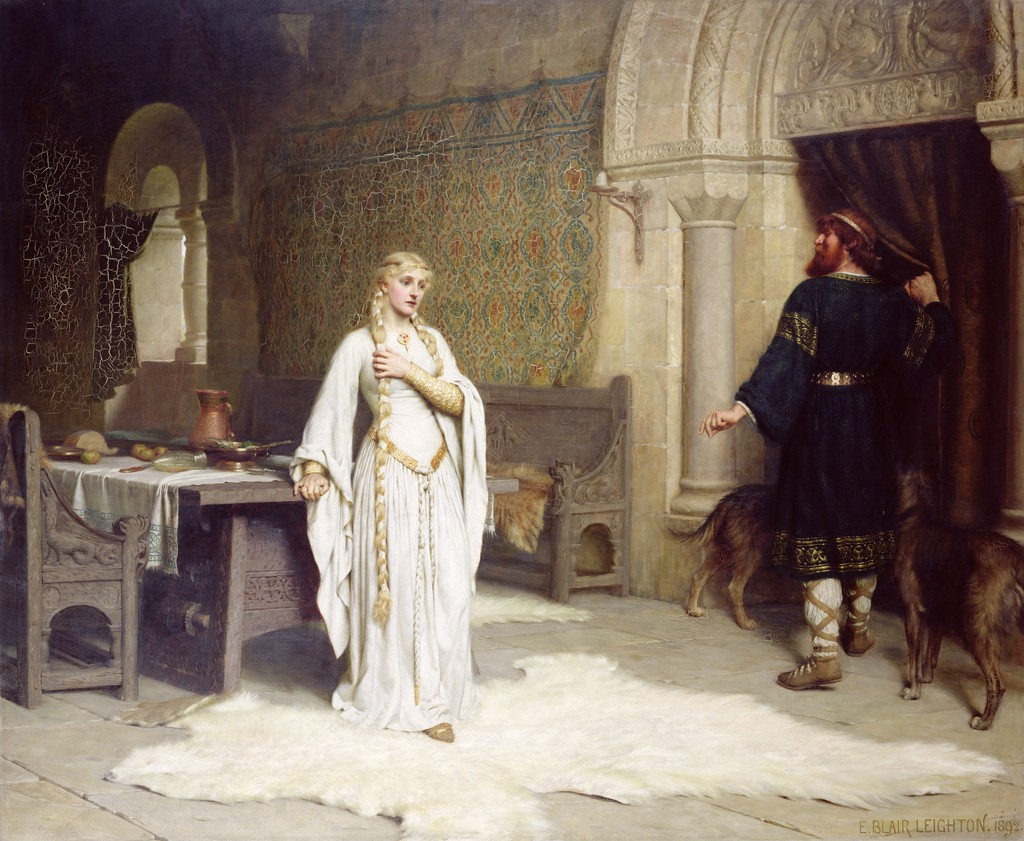
...and nodding, as in scorn, he parted, with great strides among his dogs.

"Godiva" is a poem written in 1840 by the poet Alfred, Lord Tennyson when he was returning from Coventry to London, after his visit to Warwickshire in that year. It was first published in 1842. No alteration was made in any subsequent edition.

The poem is based on the story of the Countess Godiva, an Anglo-Saxon lady who, according to legend, rode naked through the streets of Coventry after her husband promised that he would remit oppressive taxes on his tenants if she agreed to do so.
