= Claxton =

Claxton may refer to:

== Places ==
- Claxton, County Durham, England
- Claxton, Norfolk, England
- Claxton, North Yorkshire, England
- Claxton, Georgia, USA
  - the Claxton meteorite of 1984, which fell in Georgia, United States (see meteorite falls)
- Claxton, Kentucky
- Claxton, Anderson County, Tennessee
- Claxton, McMinn County, Tennessee

== Other uses ==
- Claxton (surname)
- Claxton Shield
- Claxton Bakery
- Claxton Castle
- USS Claxton (DD-571)
- USS Claxton (DD-140)
