= Claxton (surname) =

Claxton is a surname. Notable people with the surname include:

- Adelaide Claxton (fl. 1860–1890s), British artist, illustrator, and inventor
- Brooke Claxton (1898–1960), Canadian veteran of World War I
- Charles Robert Claxton (1903–1992), English Bishop
- Florence Claxton (1838–1920), British artist
- Gavin Claxton (born 1966), British screenwriter, producer and director
- Janis Claxton (1964–2018), Australian choreographer
- Jimmy Claxton (1892–1970), Canadian Afro-American baseball pitcher
- Kate Claxton (1848–1924), American actress
- Marshall Claxton (1811–1881), English artist
- Nic Claxton (born 1999), American basketball player
- Patricia Claxton (born 1929), Canadian translator
- Philander Claxton (1862–1957), American educator
- Rozelle Claxton (1913–1995), American jazz pianist
- Sarah Claxton (born 1979), English athlete
- Speedy Claxton (born 1978), American basketball player
- Thomas Claxton (doorkeeper) (died 1821), Doorkeeper of the United States House of Representatives
- Thomas Claxton (1790–1813), officer in the United States Navy during the War of 1812
- William Claxton (photographer) (1927–2008), American photographer
- William Gordon Claxton (1899–1967), Canadian World War I ace pilot
