= Lady Godiva's Prayer =

Painting by Edwin Landseer

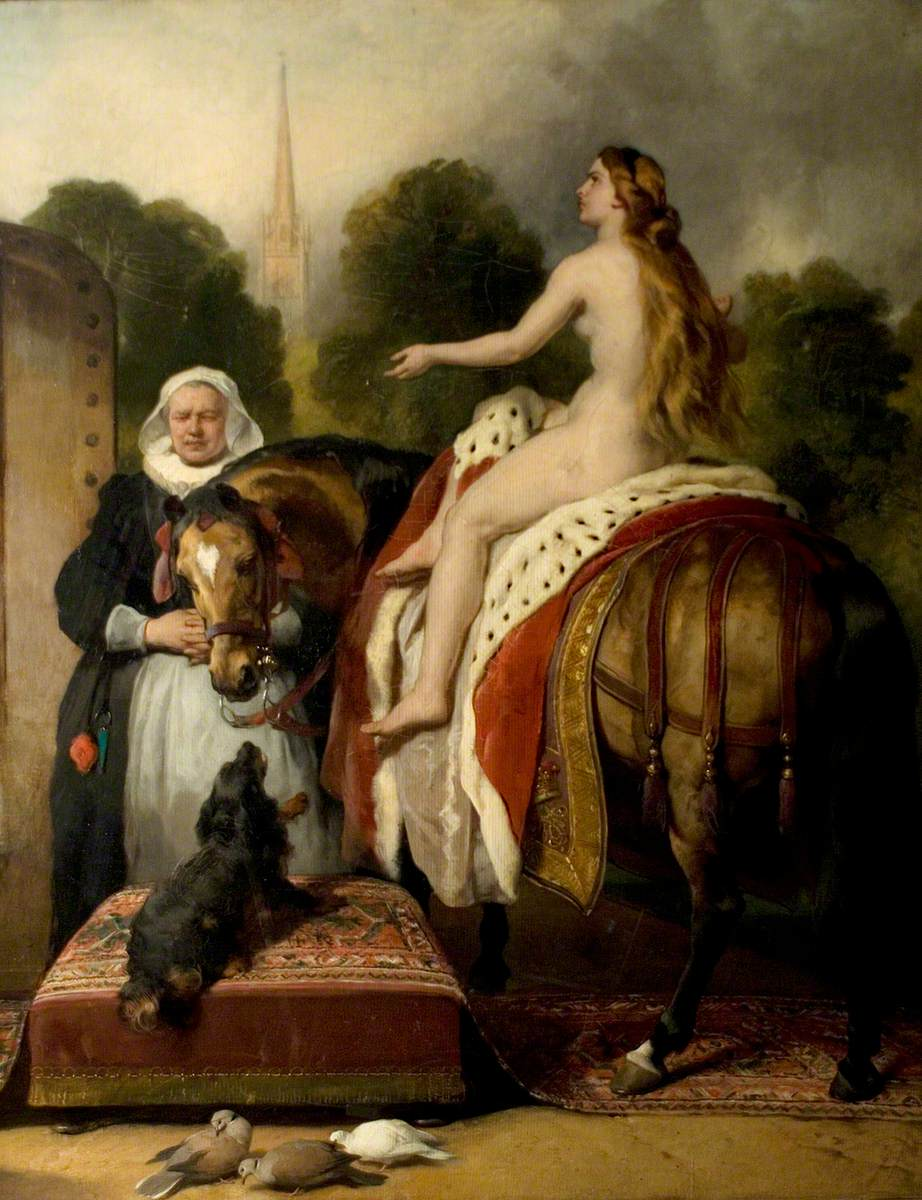
- Artist: Edwin Landseer
- Year: 1865
- Type: Oil on canvas, history painting
- Dimensions: 143 cm × 112 cm (56 in × 44 in)
- Location: Herbert Art Gallery, Coventry

Lady Godiva's Prayer is an 1865 history painting by the British artist Edwin Landseer. It depicts Lady Godiva, the noblewoman famous for her nude ride through the streets of Coventry. Godiva who made the naked procession in protest against harsh policies against the people is shown mounted on horseback sidesaddle saying a prayer before she begins. An elderly serving woman stands nearby with her eyes closed. Although the costume of the servant resembles those of 17th-century Dutch genre paintings rather those of the 11th century of Godiva. In the distance is the spire of St Michael's, later Coventry Cathedral.

Landseer began the painting in the late 1840s, when a poem by Alfred Tennyson brought Godiva back to popular attention. It likely drew inspiration from Marshall Claxton's 1850 Lady Godiva. The model was Eliza Crowe who had played Godiva in an 1848 Godiva Procession in Coventry. Queen Victoria saw the painting in the artist's studio and commented approvingly about it. Landseer may have added the ermine fur drape, representing royalty, after the Queen's visit.

The work was displayed at the Royal Academy's Summer Exhibition of 1866 at the National Gallery in London, where the painting's historical anachronisms were criticised. In 1873 the painting sold for the considerable sum of £3,360 at auction. Today the painting is in the collection of the Herbert Art Gallery in Coventry, having been acquired in 1948.

== Bibliography ==
- Clarke, Ronald Aquilla & Day, Patrick A. E. Lady Godiva: Images of a Legend in Art & Society. Leisure Services, Arts and Museums Division, 1982.
- Donoghue, Daniel. Lady Godiva: A Literary History of the Legend. John Wiley & Sons, 2008.
- Smith, Alison. The Victorian Nude: Sexuality, Morality, and Art. Manchester University Press, 1996.
