= Cluxton =

Cluxton is an Irish surname. Notable people with the surname include:

- Samuel Cluxton or Cluckston, Cluckstone (1696–1751), American member of the House of Representatives
- Stephen Cluxton (born 1981), Irish Gaelic footballer
- William Cluxton (1819–1901), Canadian businessman and political figure

== See also ==
- Claxton (surname)
