= John Rogers Herbert =

English painter (1810–1890)

John Rogers Herbert RA (23 January 1810 – 17 March 1890) was an English painter who is most notable as a precursor of Pre-Raphaelitism.

== Early career ==
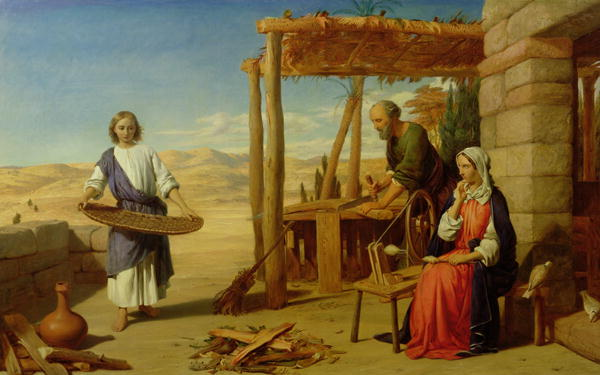
Our Saviour Subject to his Parents at Nazareth (1847). Oil on canvas

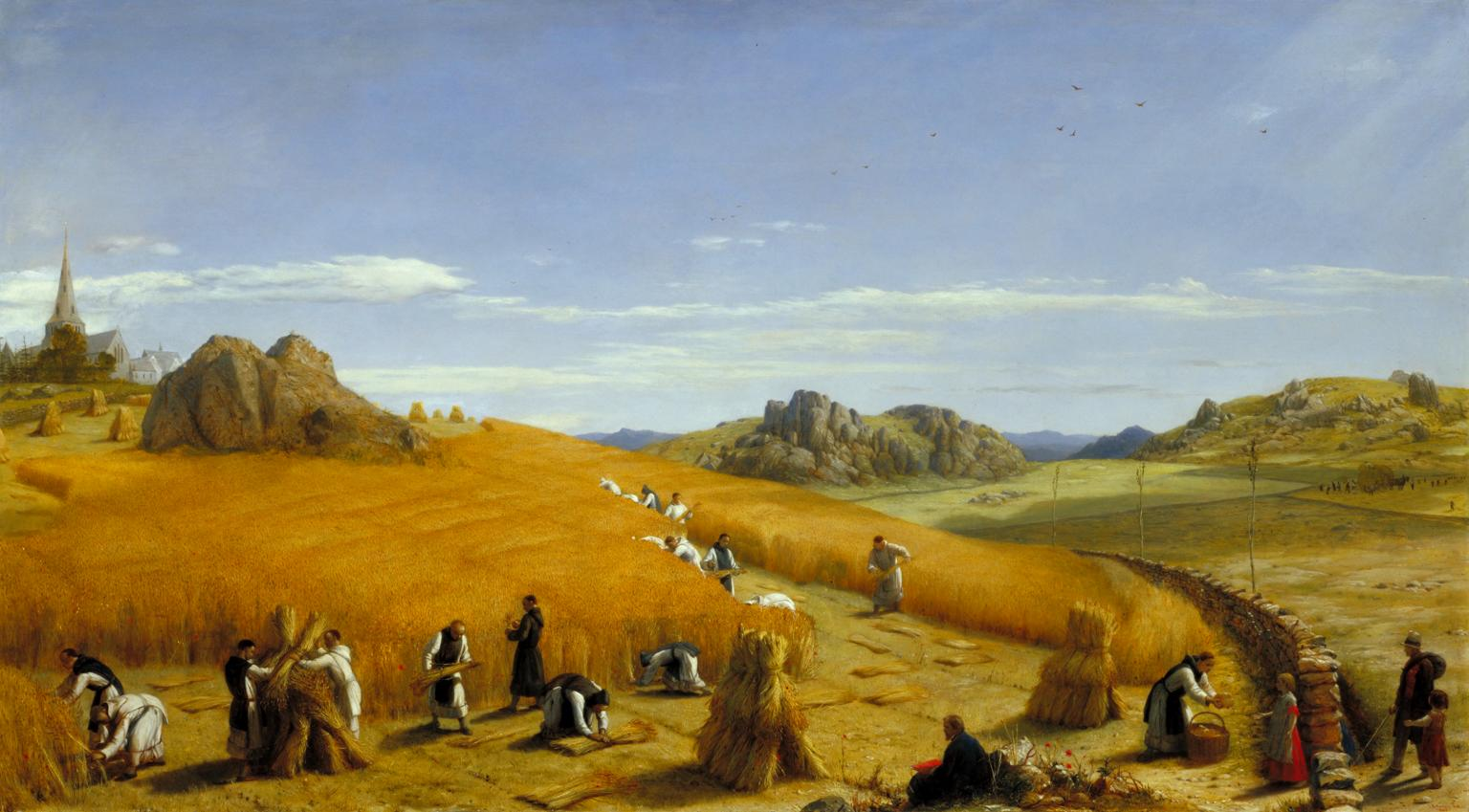
Laborare est Orare (1862). The church in the background is Mount St. Bernard Abbey painted with a spire from Pugin's designs, which was not eventually built

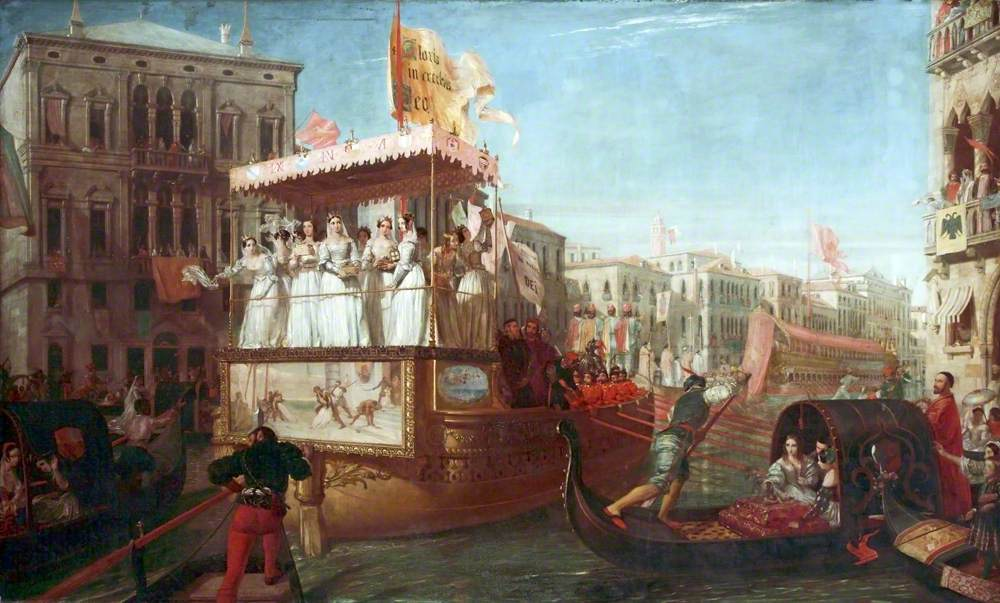
The Brides of Venice, oil on canvas

John Rogers Herbert was born in Maldon, Essex. In 1826, he moved to London to study at the Royal Academy Schools. However, after the death of his father in 1828, Herbert was forced to leave the Academy Schools and began painting professionally – mostly book illustrations and portraiture. He was successful in his early career, even painting a portrait of Princess Victoria in 1834. However, he was not satisfied with mere money-making portraits and illustrations. His early sketches predict his later interest in larger historical subjects with challenging moral themes and complex compositions. His early subjects were romantic, and many are taken from Venetian history. His work exhibited at the British Institution and the Royal Society of British Artists had titles such as: The Plain Gold Ring (1832), A Lady Watching the Stars (1834) and Guilt and Innocence (1834). Herbert's first major success was The Appointed Hour (1835), depicting a melodramatic scene in which a Venetian man lies murdered at the place appointed for a tryst with his lover. The work became a popular engraving. Herbert followed it with other dramatic subjects such as Captives Detained for a Ransom, by Condottieri (1836) and Death of Haidee (1838).

== Conversion and Pre-Raphaelitism ==
Herbert had been childhood friends with architect A. W. Pugin, and the two men were very close. Pugin, who was co-architect for the New Palace of Westminster, was a convert to Catholicism and had an influence on Herbert's decision to join the Catholic Church, which happened around 1840. It was in 1840 that Herbert painted his first 'Catholic' picture, Boar Hunters and Pilgrims of the 15th Century Receiving Refreshments at the Gate of a Convent. Herbert's conversion to the Catholic faith is a defining point in his career. His art gains a deeper purpose and becomes much more personal.

Herbert was elected an Associate of the Royal Academy in 1841, and became a full Royal Academician in 1846.

Herbert's work influenced the newly formed Pre-Raphaelite Brotherhood – who asked him to sponsor their publication The Germ, and whose artistic goal was to 'out-Herbert Herbert'. Herbert's paintings The First Introduction of Christianity into Great Britain (1842) and Our Saviour Subject to his Parents in Nazareth (1847) were the inspiration for the two most important early works of William Holman Hunt and John Everett Millais, founders of Pre-Raphaelitism. The two paintings, Hunt's A Converted British Family Sheltering a Christian Missionary and Millais' Christ in the House of His Parents were exhibited at the RA in 1850 to great controversy. Herbert used his position within the RA to help the young artists.

== Westminster frescoes ==
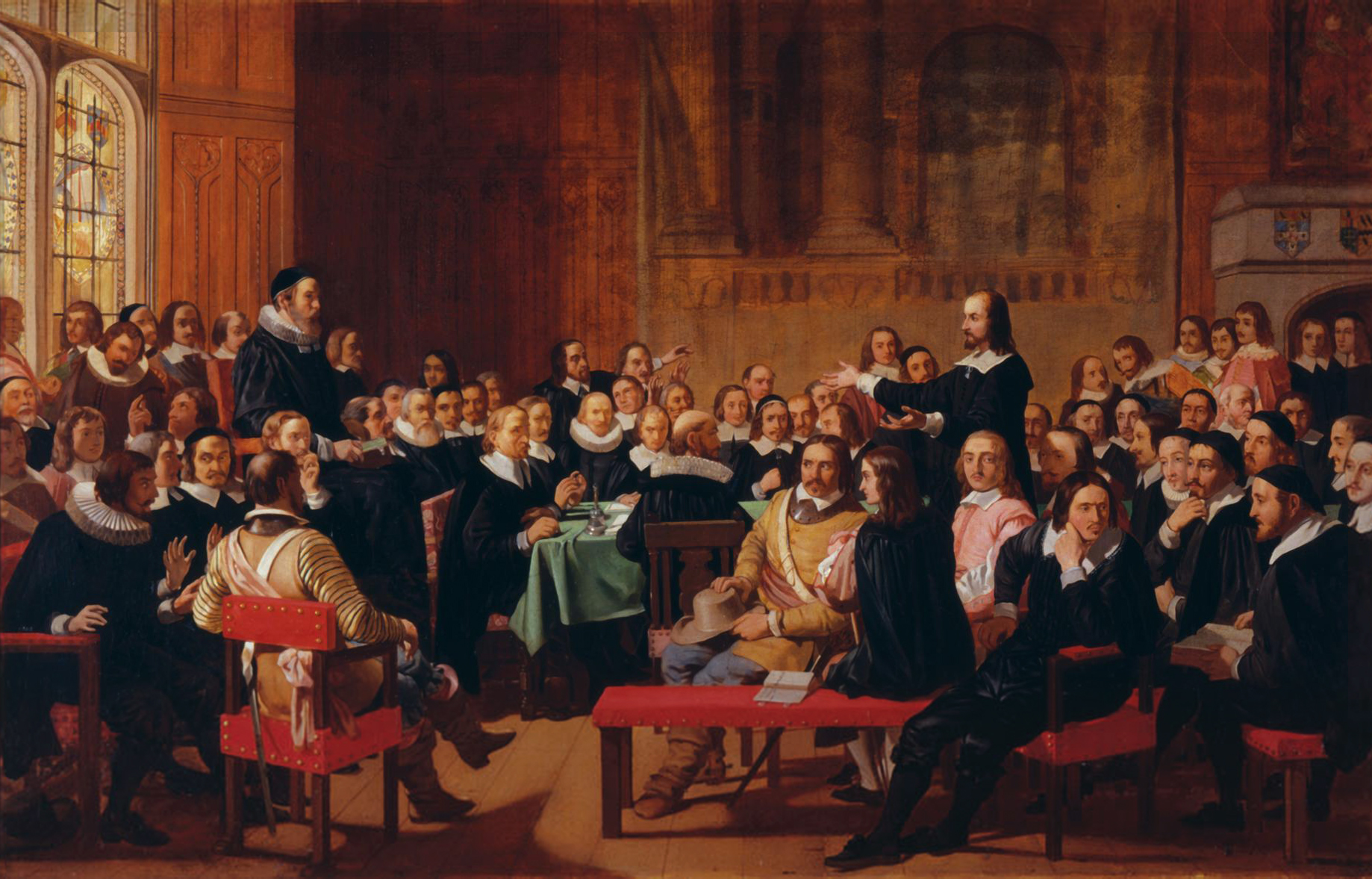
Assertion of Liberty of Conscience by the Independents of the Westminster Assembly of Divines, 1847, Palace of Westminster

When the old Palace of Westminster was destroyed by fire in 1834, it was considered a great opportunity for British art. In 1845 Herbert was commissioned, along with several other artists, to paint scenes from English literature in the Poet's Hall in the Palace of Westminster. The commission followed several cartoon competitions and much national coverage, and Herbert was assigned a subject from Shakespeare, Lear Disinheriting Cordelia.

Lear Disinheriting Cordelia (1850) is the first work of Hebert's to show the overt influence of the Nazarenes. The fresco, and related oil works, were critically and publicly acclaimed. However, the fresco itself began to deteriorate almost immediately. Modern restoration has discovered the problem to have been a combination of fire and gas pollution and the use of lime plaster.

After the success of Lear, Herbert was commissioned in 1850 to paint nine more frescoes in the Peer's Robing Room, on the theme of "Justice on Earth, and its development in Law and Judgement". The frescoes would illustrate scenes from Biblical history including Moses bringing down the Tables of the Law to the Israelites, The Fall of Man, His Condemnation to Labour, The Judgement of Solomon, The Visit of the Queen of Sheba, The Building of the Temple, The Judgement of Daniel, Daniel in the Lion's Den and The Vision of Daniel.

Herbert began on Moses in 1858. The process was painstaking and frustrating, owing to the continuous deterioration of the fresco as he painted it. In 1861 Herbert erased the entire work and started again in the waterglass technique, as suggested by Prince Albert. He finally finished in 1864, but the time taken to understand the technique was unexpected, and had not produced a perfect result, as the painting continued to deteriorate. Nevertheless, Herbert considered Moses one of his most important works.

Herbert negotiated a higher rate than originally agreed for Moses, owing to the time it had taken him to complete it. However, because of the delay, the death of Prince Albert and the unsuccessful fresco and waterglass techniques, Herbert's commissions for the other works were cancelled. However, he painted The Judgement of Daniel in oil, and presented it to the Palace years later, in 1880.

== Notable works ==
- The Appointed Hour (1835)
- The First Introduction of Christianity into Great Britain (1842)
- The Procession of the Brides of Venice (1843)
- Sir Thomas More and his Daughter (1844)
- The Trial of the Seven Bishops (1844)
- St. Gregory the Great teaching the Roman Boys to Sing the Chant (1845)
- Our Saviour Subject to his Parents at Nazareth (1847)
- Lear Disinheriting Cordelia (1850)
- The Hebrew Mother of Moses (1857–1858)
- Moses and the Tables of the Law (1858–1864)
- Mary Magdalene (1859)
- Laborare est Orare (1862)
- Valley of Moses, in the Desert of Sinai (1866)
- Asyut on the Nile (1873)
- Landscape with Tobias and the Fish (1877)
- Outside Jerusalem (1878)
- The Judgement of Daniel (1880)
- Nazareth (1886)
