= John Bailey Shelton =

British archaeologist (1875–1958)

John Bailey Shelton MBE
- Born: 19 March 1875; Kirkby Woodhouse, Nottinghamshire, England
- Died: 29 November 1958 (aged 83)
- Known for: Pioneering rescue archaeology
- Spouse: Mary Catherine Ashton
- Children: 2

John Bailey Shelton MBE (19 March 1875 – 29 November 1958) was a British archaeologist who worked in the city of Coventry and a pioneer of rescue archaeology.

== Biography ==
JB Shelton was born on 19 March 1875 in Kirkby Woodhouse, between Nottingham and Mansfield. His father was a farm labourer and John was one of 11 or 12 children, not all of whom survived childhood. He was educated at a Dame School near Kirkby Woodhouse, from 2 years of age, then at the local Board School. His formal education ended at aged 10 when, because of the poverty of his family, he went to work on Labour in Vain Farm near Bilsthorpe. He earned one shilling a week, plus his board, and, other than Christmas Day and Good Friday, had only one day off each year. Aged 12, he went to Nottingham Goose Fair to find work and was employed by the squire of Annesley Woodhouse. He worked here for 12 years, during which he gained a reputation as the best shepherd in the area.

In 1897, aged 22 years, Shelton moved to Coventry, where he found lodgings in Thomas Street and began work as a drayman for the London and North Western Railway. He attended and was Sunday School teacher at the Wesleyan Chapel in Warwick Lane, now Methodist Central Hall, where he met Catherine Ashton at the Young People's Bible Class. In 1899, the Marriage Register of Warwick Lane recorded that John Bailey Shelton, aged 24, Drayman, living at 39 Greyfriars Lane, married Mary Catherine Ashton, aged 20, Spinster, Ribbon Weaver, of 30 Albion Street. Their son, Bailey, was born in their home in Cow Lane, and they later moved to Sackville Street where Kathleen, their daughter was born.

By 1907, having saved the sum of £100, Shelton started his own haulage business in Little Park Street, initially working for the cardboard box makers, Bushill's, whose factory was in Cow Lane. He moved to Little Park Street where he could keep his horses on the premises.

By the outbreak of World War 1, Shelton was the owner of a thriving business, with six cart horses.

In 1923, Shelton was elected to the Board of Guardians, and worked with the chairman of the board, Joseph Allen, with particular concern for the residents of the workhouse in Gulson Road and the poor of Coventry. For many years he visited the residents each Sunday, taking bags of sweets to distribute.

== Archaeology ==
Shelton's active involvement in archaeology began in 1927. In an unpublished paper, "22 years of excavation", Shelton wrote that he researched ancient Coventry when he was in hospital for nine weeks with a fractured right leg. Later during convalescence, mobile on crutches, he watched the builders Messrs. Harris and Sons excavating on the site of the Hare and Squirrel, in Cheylesmore, only a short distance from his home in Little Park Street. His record of the excavation, later lost in the fire in his library during the Blitz, refers to finding sandstone walls, a medieval stone-lined well, fourteenth century pottery and encaustic tiles, which he interpreted as evidence of a chapel of Greyfriars, built about 1234.

As the medieval city of Coventry was demolished in the 1930s, Shelton took an amateur interest in the excavations and was often seen, in white coat and straw hat, climbing in the excavations and rubble. As a result, he collected a considerable number of historical items and opened his own museum in his shed in Little Park Street, later to be renamed as the Benedictine Museum. These would later form the core of the archaeological collections of the new Herbert Art Gallery and Museum. Shelton wrote regular articles during the 1930s detailing his finds, and these were published in Austin's Monthly Magazine.

The bombing of Coventry in 1940 destroyed many of Shelton's papers and books when his house and stables were set on fire. He was later awarded the Queen Victoria Medal of the RSPCA for the courage he displayed in rescuing his horses. As his home had been destroyed, Shelton and his wife, who had been injured in the blast, and died in 1946, moved into a caravan in Little Park Street with his museum in what remained of the house. He later moved to Priory Street, built over the old St Michael's cemetery.

Following the Blitz, Shelton explored the damaged Ford's Hospital, Coventry and discovered encaustic tiles that suggested that the hospital was built on top of the site of an old chapel.

Shelton was appointed as City Chamberlain of Coventry on 20 March 1945, an office of the city council since 1269, and held by two men each year. His main duty was to be Visitors Guide of St Mary's Hall, and he received an honorarium of 100 guineas a year.

In 1956 he was awarded the MBE for his services to the history, archaeology and people of Coventry. Shelton died 29 November 1958, one week after being hit by a motorcycle while out walking in the Green Lane area. Since 1959, the John Shelton Memorial Lecture has been held in his name. Both John Shelton Primary School, in the northern suburbs of Coventry, and Shelton Square, in Coventry city centre, are named after him.

== Bibliography ==
- M. Rylatt and A.F. Adams (1983). A Harvest of History: The life & work of J.B.Shelton M.B.E. J.B. Shelton Memorial Lecture Fund Sponsoring Committee. ISBN 0-901606-47-2.
