= Christ in the House of His Parents =

1849–50 painting by John Everett Millais

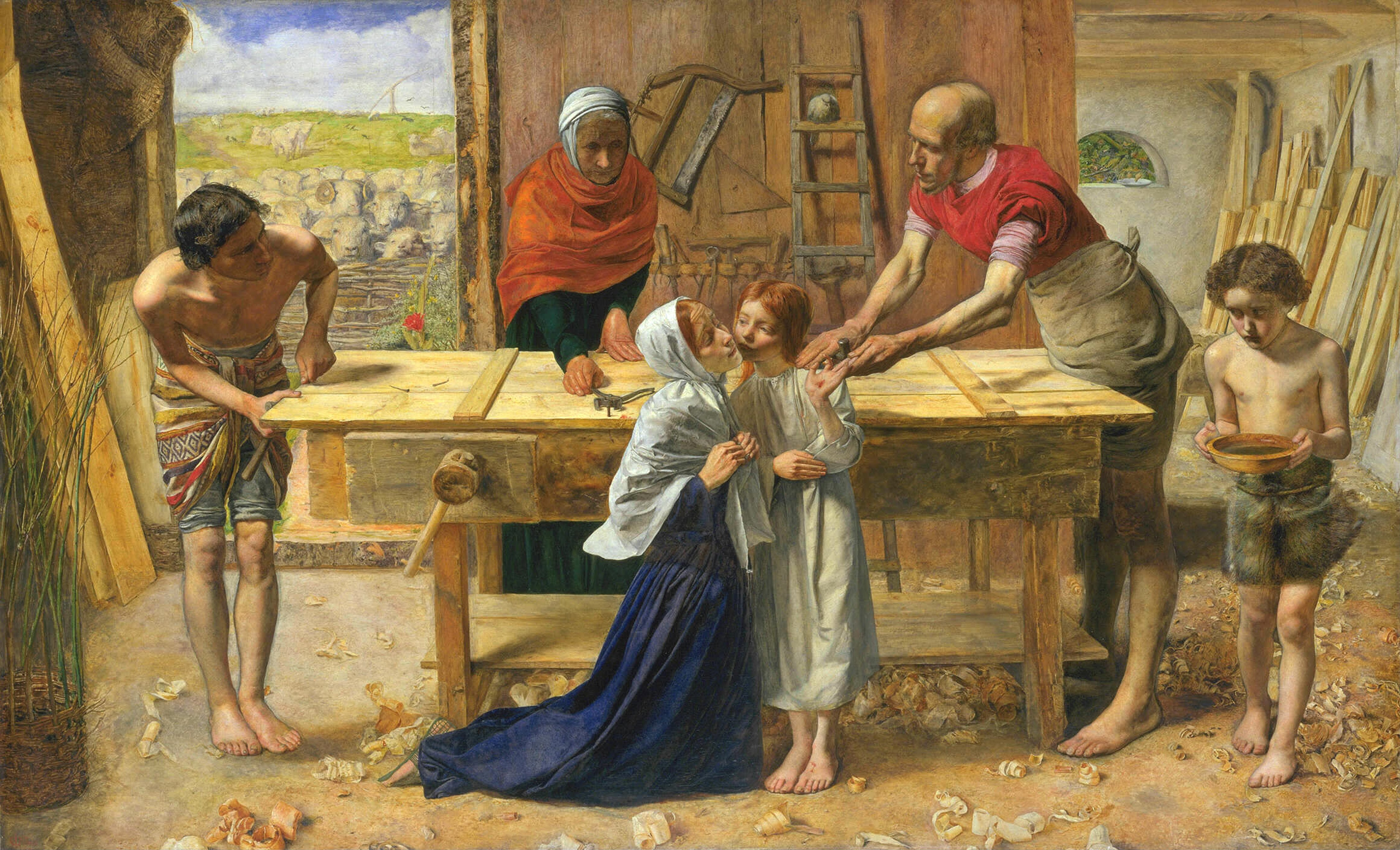
- Artist: John Everett Millais
- Year: 1849–1850
- Medium: Oil on canvas
- Dimensions: 86.4 cm × 139.7 cm (34.0 in × 55.0 in)
- Location: Tate Britain, London

Christ in the House of His Parents (1849–50) is a painting by John Everett Millais depicting the Holy Family in Saint Joseph's carpentry workshop. The painting was extremely controversial when first exhibited, prompting many negative reviews, most notably one written by Charles Dickens. It catapulted the previously obscure Pre-Raphaelite Brotherhood to notoriety and was a major contributor to the debate about Realism in the arts. It is now in Tate Britain in London.

== Subject ==
The painting depicts the young Jesus assisting Joseph in his workshop. Joseph is making a door, which is laid upon his carpentry work-table. Jesus has cut his hand on an exposed nail, symbolizing the stigmata and foreshadowing Jesus's crucifixion. Some of the blood has fallen onto his foot. As Jesus's grandmother, Anne, removes the nail with a pair of pincers, his concerned mother, Mary, offers her cheek for a kiss. Joseph examines Jesus's wounded hand. A young boy, who would later be known as John the Baptist, brings in water to wash the wound, prefiguring his later baptism of Christ. An assistant of Joseph, who represents Jesus's future Apostles, observes these events.

In the background of the painting various objects are used to further symbolize the theological significance of the subject. A ladder, referring to Jacob's Ladder, leans against the back wall, and a dove which represents the Holy Spirit rests on it. Other carpentry implements refer to the Holy Trinity. Millais likely used Albrecht Dürer's print Melancholia I as a source for this imagery, along with Quattrocento works. The sheep in the sheepfold seen through the door represent the future Christian flock.

It has been suggested that Millais was influenced by John Rogers Herbert's painting Our Saviour Subject to His Parents at Nazareth. He may also have drawn on a painting depicting Jesus helping Joseph in his workshop, which at the time was attributed to Annibale Carracci.

== Critical response ==
The painting was immensely controversial when first exhibited because of its realistic depiction of a carpentry workshop, especially the dirt and detritus on the floor. The portrayal of Jesus and those surrounding Him was often considered to be radical, both in dress and in figure. Critics objected to the representation of Jesus, one complaining that it was "painful" to see "the youthful Saviour" depicted as "a red-headed Jew boy". Charles Dickens described Millais' Jesus as a "wry-necked, blubbering red-headed boy in a bed-gown, who appears to have received a poke ... playing in an adjacent gutter". Dickens also accused Millais of portraying Mary as an alcoholic who looks

so hideous in her ugliness that ... she would stand out from the rest of the company as a Monster, in the vilest cabaret in France, or the lowest gin-shop in England.

Other critics suggested that the characters displayed signs of rickets and other disease associated with slum conditions. Because of the controversy, Queen Victoria asked for the painting to be taken to Buckingham Palace so that she could view it in private.

At the Royal Academy the painting was exhibited with a companion piece by Millais's colleague, William Holman Hunt, that also portrayed a scene from early Christian history in which a family help a wounded individual. This was entitled A Converted British Family Sheltering a Christian Missionary from the Persecution of the Druids.

== Consequences ==
External videos
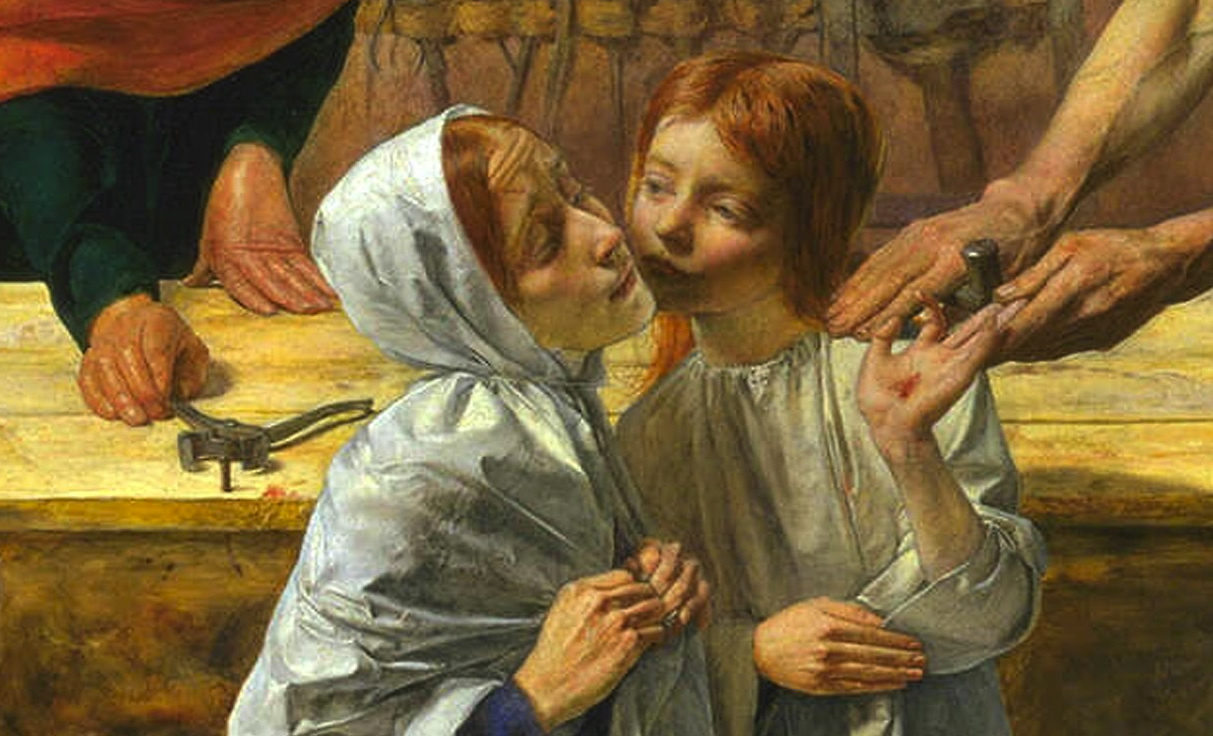
- "Sir John Everett Millais, Christ in the House of His Parents". Smarthistory

The effect of the critical comments was to make the Pre-Raphaelite movement famous and to create a debate about the relationship between modernity, realism and medievalism in the arts. The critic John Ruskin supported Millais in a letter to the press and in his lecture "Pre-Raphaelitism" despite personally disliking the painting. The painting's use of symbolic realism led to a wider movement in which the choice of composition and theme was combined with detailed observation.

== See also ==
- List of paintings by John Everett Millais
