= Lady Godiva (Claxton) =

Painting by Marshall Claxton

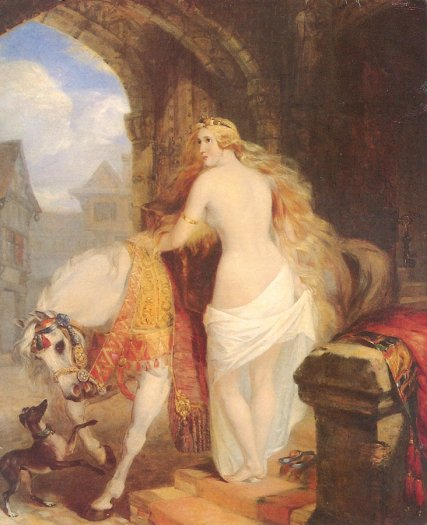
- Artist: Marshall Claxton
- Year: 1850
- Type: Oil on canvas, history painting
- Dimensions: 61 cm × 51 cm (24 in × 20 in)
- Location: Herbert Art Gallery; Coventry

Lady Godiva is an 1850 history painting by the British artist Marshall Claxton. It depicts the eleventh century Anglo-Saxon noblewoman Lady Godiva, shortly before her naked horseback ride through the streets of Coventry. It shows Godiva about to mount her horse to protest against her husband's policies.

The painting drew inspiration from the 1840 poem by Alfred Tennyson which revived interest in the legend. Edwin Landseer may have been influenced by Claxton's painting for his own work Lady Godiva's Prayer. Today the painting is in the collection of the Herbert Art Gallery, having been acquired in 1958.

== Bibliography ==
- Clarke, Ronald Aquilla & Day, Patrick A. E. Lady Godiva: Images of a Legend in Art & Society. Leisure Services, Arts and Museums Division, 1982.
- Lancaster, John Cadogan. Godiva of Coventry. University of Michigan, 1967.
