= The Porter and the Hare =

Painting by Johann Zoffany

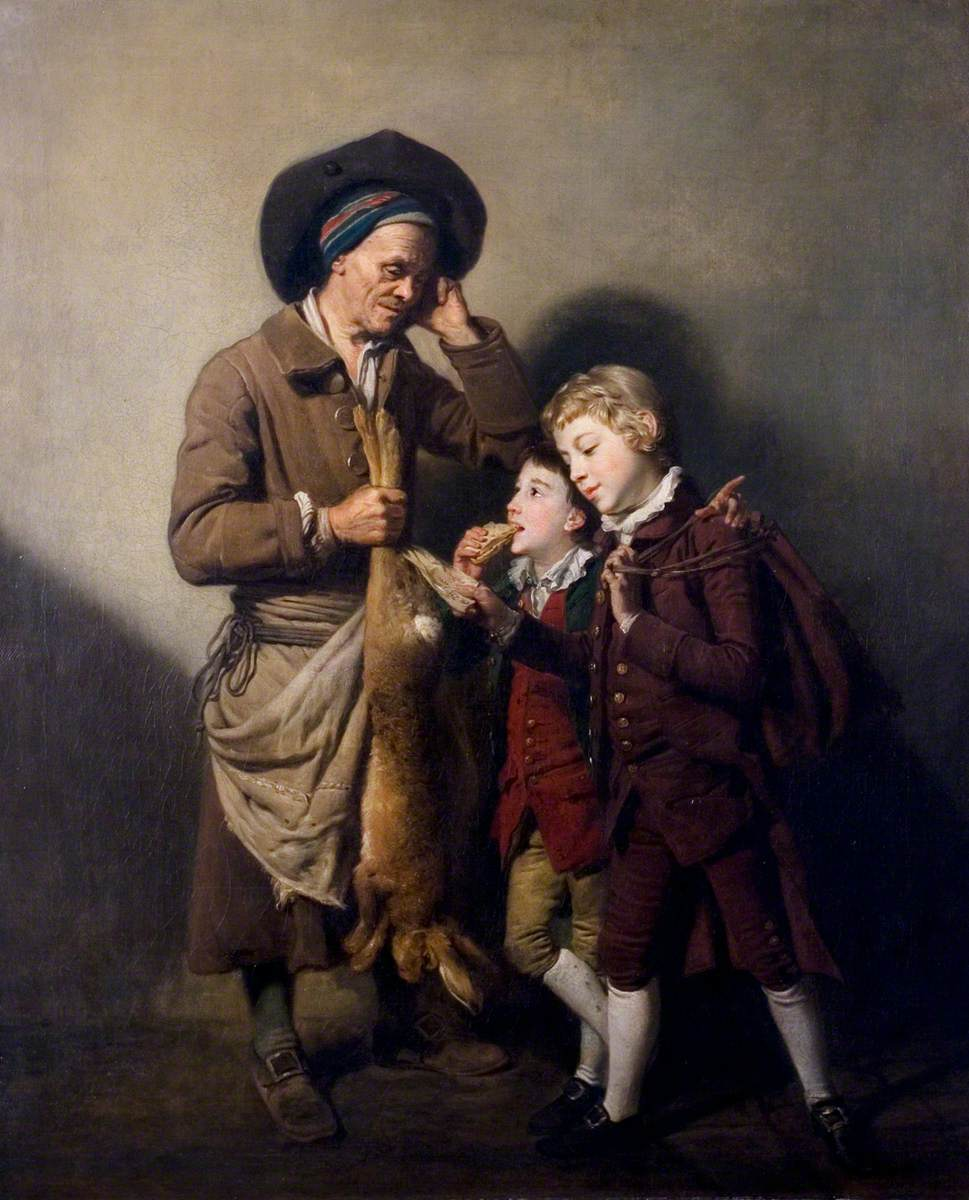
- Artist: Johan Zoffany
- Year: 1768
- Type: Oil on canvas, genre painting
- Dimensions: 76 cm × 63 cm (30 in × 25 in)
- Location: Herbert Art Gallery; Coventry

The Porter and the Hare is a 1768 genre painting by the German painter Johann Zoffany. It depicts a London street trader, a common theme during the mid-Georgian era. The painting represents one of the earliest depictions of a sandwich, which had been pioneered by the politician Lord Sandwich a few years earlier. It is currently in the collection of the Herbert Art Gallery in Coventry, having been acquired in 1955.

== Bibliography ==
- Postle, Martin. Angels & Urchins: The Fancy Picture in 18th-century British Art. Djanogly Art Gallery, 1998.
- Treadwell, Penelope. Johan Zoffany: Artist and Adventurer. Paul Holberton, 2009.
- Webster, Mary. Johan Zoffany, 1733-1810. National Portrait Gallery, 1976.
- Wright, Christopher, Gordon, Catherine May & Smith, Mary Peskett. British and Irish Paintings in Public Collections: An Index of British and Irish Oil Paintings by Artists Born Before 1870 in Public and Institutional Collections in the United Kingdom and Ireland. Yale University Press, 2006.
