= Claxton, Norfolk =

Village in Norfolk, England

Coordinates: 52.579°N 1.453°E

Claxton
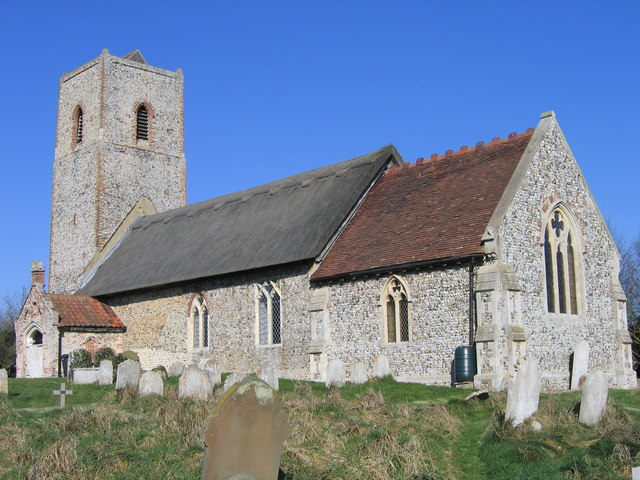
- St. Andrew's Church

- Location within Norfolk
- Area: 4.25 km^{2} (1.64 sq mi)
- Population: 298 (2021)
  - Density: 70/km^{2} (180/sq mi)
- OS grid reference: TG344031
- Civil parish: Claxton
- District: South Norfolk
- Shire county: Norfolk
- Region: East
- Country: England
- Sovereign state: United Kingdom
- Post town: NORWICH
- Postcode district: NR14
- Dialling code: 01508
- Police: Norfolk
- Fire: Norfolk
- Ambulance: East of England
- UK Parliament: South Norfolk

Claxton is a small village and civil parish in the English county of Norfolk.

Claxton is located 3.2 miles (5.1 km) north of Loddon and 7.3 miles (11.7 km) south-east of Norwich. The village is located south of the River Yare and to the north of the small villages of Ashby St Mary and Carleton St Peter.

== History ==
The origin of Claxton's name is uncertain but it derives from Old English for either the Viking Klakkr's or the Anglo-Saxon Clacc's settlement.

In the Domesday Book, Claxton is described as a settlement of 44 households located in the hundred of Lodding. In 1086, the village was divided between the estates of Roger Bigot and Godric the Steward.

To the east of the village are the remains of Claxton Castle, which dates from the mid-14th century, licences to crenellate having been granted in 1340 and 1376. Situated on private land in the grounds of Claxton Manor House it comprises a massive brick-and-flint wall 130 feet (40 m) long with six bastions.

Claxton Manor House itself was built in the reign of Elizabeth I but has a Victorian façade. The Manor was bought in 1946 by Major Derek Allhusen, who achieved fame as a horseman winning team gold and individual silver at the 1968 Summer Olympics. Derek Allhusen died in 2000.

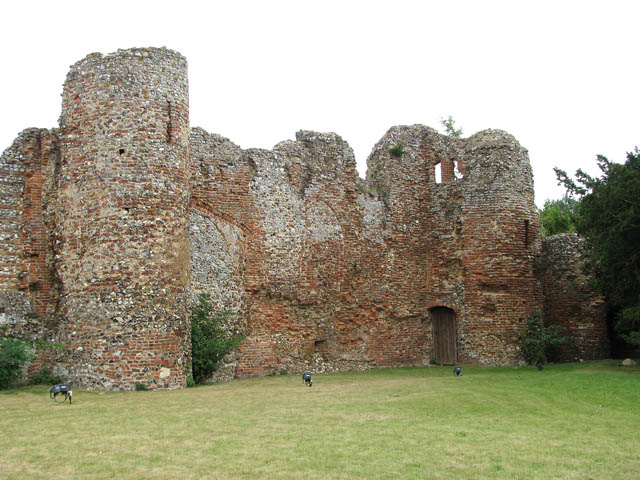
C14 ruins of Claxton Castle

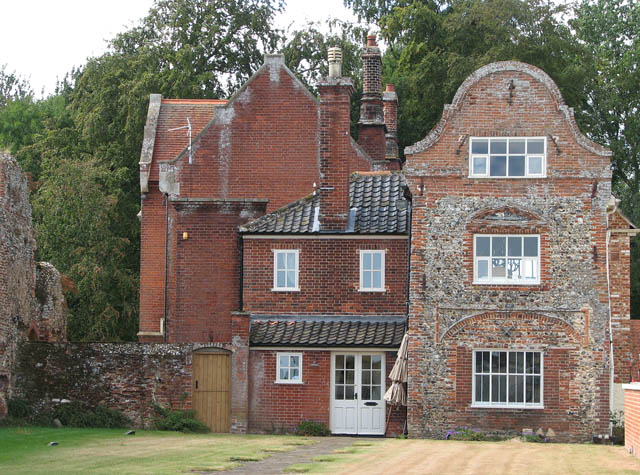
Claxton Manor House

Between 1926 and 1936 a narrow gauge railway ran the 1 mile (1.6 km) from Claxton Manor Farm in the village north to the south bank of the River Yare. In 1928 it was extended south to Staines Barn, just east of the church. It was used to transport sugar beet bound for the factory at Cantley which was loaded onto wherries at the river. It used 2-foot (610 mm) gauge jubilee track and a converted Model T Ford as motive power.

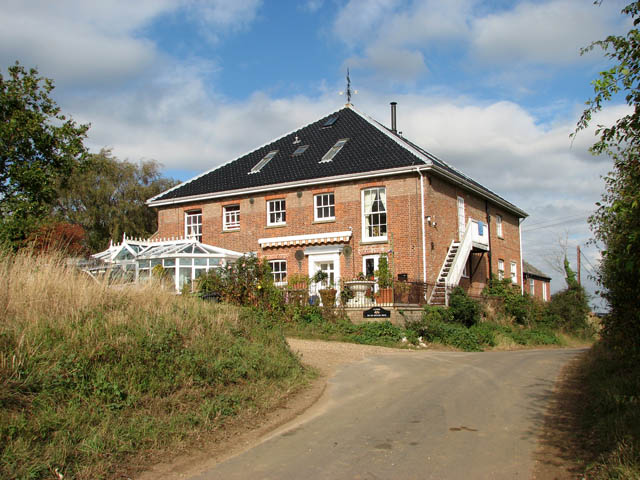
Old Meeting House

A windmill once stood at the eastern end of the village on Mill Lane. It was demolished in 1945 as it was thought to be a landmark for enemy aircraft. A Spitfire crash-landed in Claxton Marsh to the north of the village in the same year and is now on display at the Norfolk and Suffolk Aviation Museum.

Claxton no longer has a pub (closed 1974), post office (closed 1977) or school (closed 1981), although a combined shop and petrol station survived until 2002. It does have a village hall, Claxton Village Hall is shared with Carleton St Peter. The current hall was opened in 1984 and is home to a social club founded in 1987 and licensed for the sale of alcohol.

== Geography ==
According to the 2021 census, Claxton has a population of 298 people which shows a minor increase from the 291 people recorded in the 2011 census.

Claxton is served by bus route 85 operated by Our Bus providing three services a day into Norwich via Rockland St Mary, Bramerton and Kirby Bedon. It also lies on National Cycle Route 1 on its route from Norwich to Beccles via Loddon.

South of the village on the banks of Carleton Beck lies Ducan's Marsh, a Site of Special Scientific Interest and one of the richest areas of unimproved wet grassland in East Norfolk.

== St. Andrew's Church ==
Claxton's parish church is dedicated to Saint Andrew and is located on Church Lane. The church dates to the Twelfth Century and has been Grade I listed since 1960.

St. Andrews' boasts a thatched scissor-beam roof with basketweave sarking with a flint tower. The church was lightly restored in the Victorian era but retains much of its simplistic Medieval charm.

Claxton has a Strict and Particular Baptist chapel erected in the 1750s and could hold 500 in its heyday, but finally closed for worship in 1943. Claxton Opera staged occasional performances in the Old Meeting House from 2004 to 2013.It is now a private home.

== Notable residents ==
- Major Derek Allhusen CVO- (1914-2000) Olympic equestrian, lived in Claxton.

== Governance ==
Claxton is part of the electoral ward of Rockland for local elections and is part of the district of South Norfolk.

The village's national constituency is South Norfolk which has been represented by the Labour's Ben Goldsborough MP since 2024.

== War Memorial ==
Claxton's war memorial is a small marble plaque located in the porch of St. Andrew's Church. It lists the following names for the First World War:

Rank	Name	Unit	Date of death	Burial
Pte.	Frederick G. Vincent	7th Bn., Royal Fusiliers	5 Apr. 1918	Arras Memorial
Pte.	Arthur J. Sharman	7th Bn., Norfolk Regiment	13 Oct. 1915	Arras Road Cemetery
Pte.	William H. Thrower	6th Bn., Northamptonshire Regiment	22 Mar. 1918	Chauny Cemetery

There is no war memorial for Claxton for casualties of the Second World War.
