= Herbert Art Gallery and Museum =

Museum and art gallery in Coventry, England

Coordinates: 52.407159°N 1.506098°W

Herbert Art Gallery & Museum
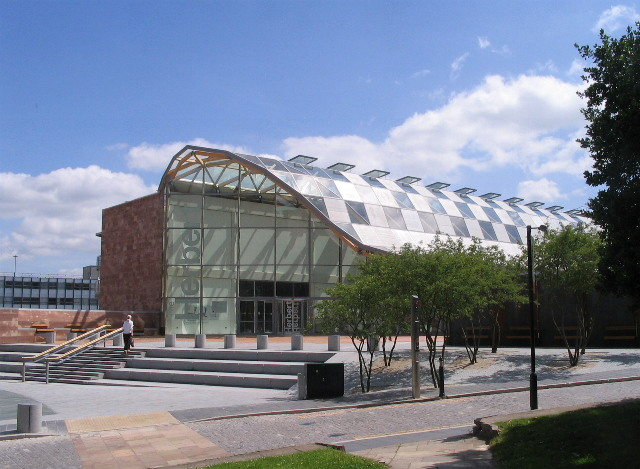
- Herbert Art Gallery & Museum from Cathedral Square
- Established: 1960
- Location: Jordan Well, Coventry, England
- Visitors: >1 million between 2008 and 2011
- Public transit access: Pool Meadow Bus Station
- Website: www.theherbert.org

Herbert Art Gallery & Museum (also known as the Herbert) is a museum, art gallery, records archive, learning centre, media studio and creative arts facility on Jordan Well, Coventry, England.

== Overview ==
The museum is named after Sir Alfred Herbert, a Coventry industrialist and philanthropist whose gifts enabled the original building to be opened in 1960. Building began in 1939, with an interruption by the Second World War, and the Herbert opened in 1960. In 2008, it reopened after a £14 million refurbishment.

The Herbert is run by Culture Coventry, a registered charity. It derives financial support from donations, sales at the museum shop, and hiring the buildings out. In 2010, the museum and gallery received more than 300,000 visitors, making it one of the most popular tourist attractions in the West Midlands.

== History ==
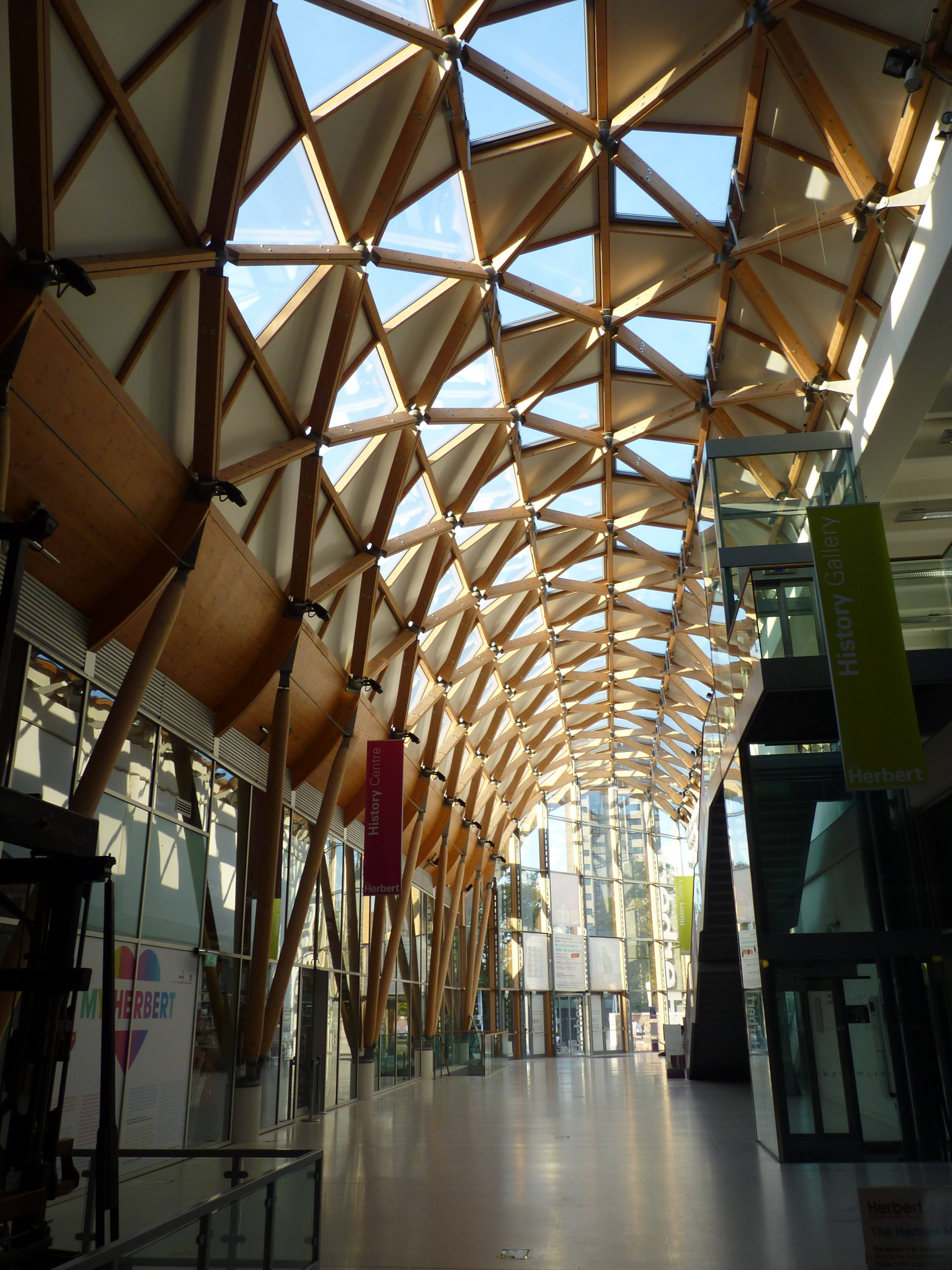
The covered court of the museum and art gallery in 2011

=== Benedictine Museum and foundation: Pre-war ===
Museums in Coventry before the Herbert included the museum of the Coventry City Guild and the Benedictine Museum, opened by J. B. Shelton in the 1930s. However, Coventry City Council's collection of art treasures and museum pieces were housed in various buildings, and so the council acquired a half-acre site over a number of years costing £35,375. In 1938 the philanthropist Sir Alfred Herbert donated £100,000 to the corporation to erect a gallery and museum on the site. Plans were drawn up by the Leicester architect Albert Herbert, a cousin of Sir Alfred, and building began the following year.

The city's destruction during the Coventry Blitz meant construction was suspended, with only the basement completed. City architect Donald Gibson's radical rebuilding plan for Coventry city centre became war time propaganda for the post-war reconstruction of Britain. But, post-war economies required Gibson to concentrate on a building programme for the suburbs. Completion of the first building under his plan was delayed until 1953.

New plans for the museum were drawn up in 1952 by the Leicester architects, Albert Herbert & Son, and in May 1954 the foundation stone was laid by Herbert, who also donated a further £100,000 to the project. Herbert died in May 1957, and the museum and art gallery that bears his name was opened on 9 March 1960 by his third wife Lady Herbert.

=== Refurbishment: 2005–2008 ===
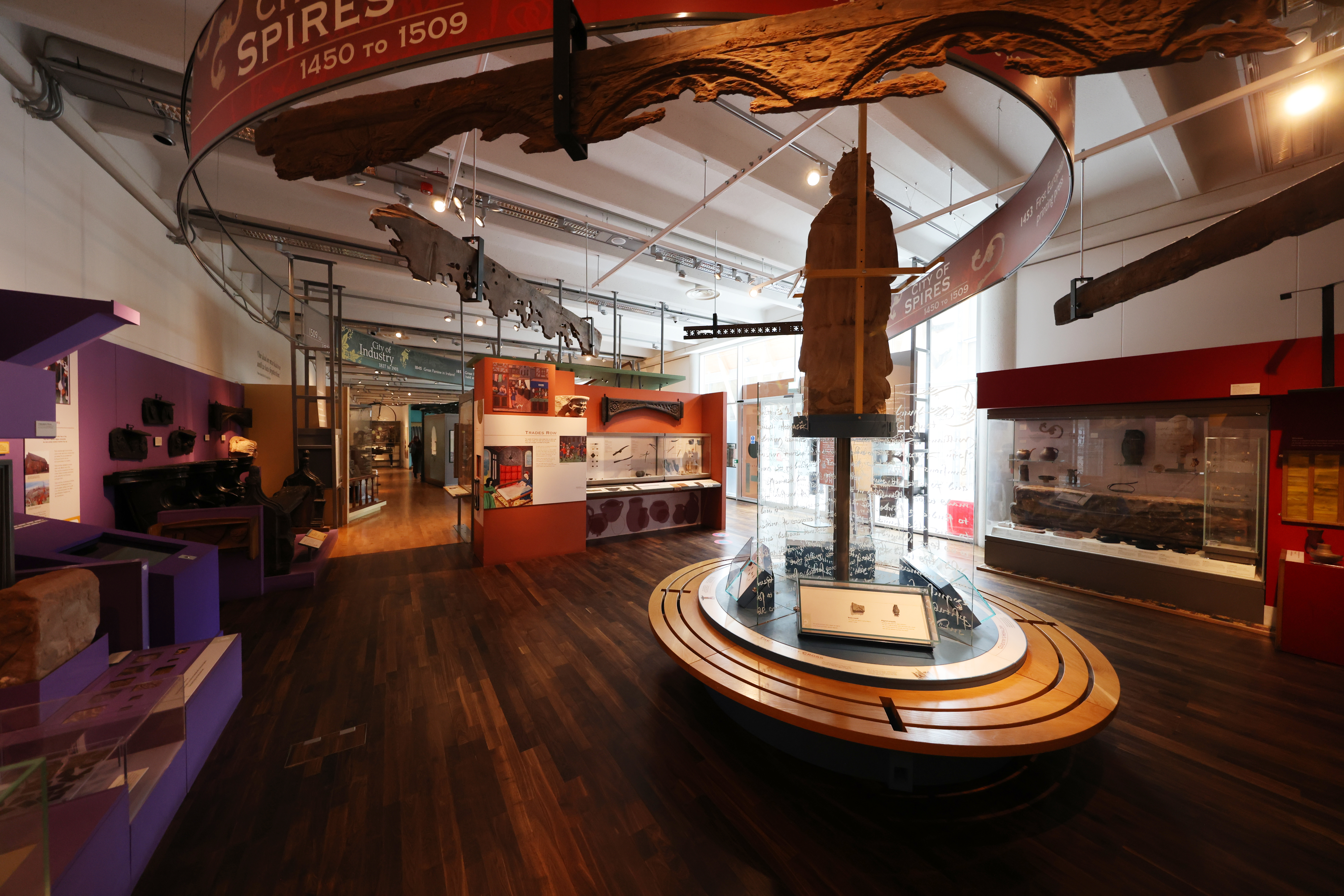
The history gallery

The first phase of a two-phase refurbishment was completed in 2005 with £3 million of funds from Coventry City Council, Advantage West Midlands and the European Regional Development Fund. During the refurbishment, it was considered that a painting by seventeenth-century artist Luca Giordano was too large and fragile to be moved. Instead the 3.02 by 5.83 metres (9.9 by 19.1 ft) canvas, which has been with The Herbert since the 1960s and described as one of the museum's most prized paintings, was boarded up in 2005 and uncovered three years later in time for the opening.

In early 2008, the second phase was completed at a cost of £14 million. A new entrance on Bayley Lane was provided, along with a 500 sq. metre glass-covered court extension. The extended buildings include a new cafe area, education, training, creative media and arts information facilities, additional gallery spaces for temporary exhibitions, and facilities for conservation work and to preserve the city records and archive.

=== Culture Coventry ===
The Herbert is part of Culture Coventry, which also manages three additional local heritage sites: Coventry Transport Museum, the Old Grammar School, and the Lunt Roman Fort, situated three miles outside Coventry at Baginton.

The museum won the Guardian Family Friendly Award 2010. The same year, the gallery was shortlisted for the Art Fund Prize in recognition of its outstanding work in engaging new and diverse audiences.

The museum has also partnered with Google Arts & Culture to produce partnership pages including the history and story of Lady Godiva, medieval artifacts from Coventry and the life and friendships of the writer George Elliot.

== Collections ==
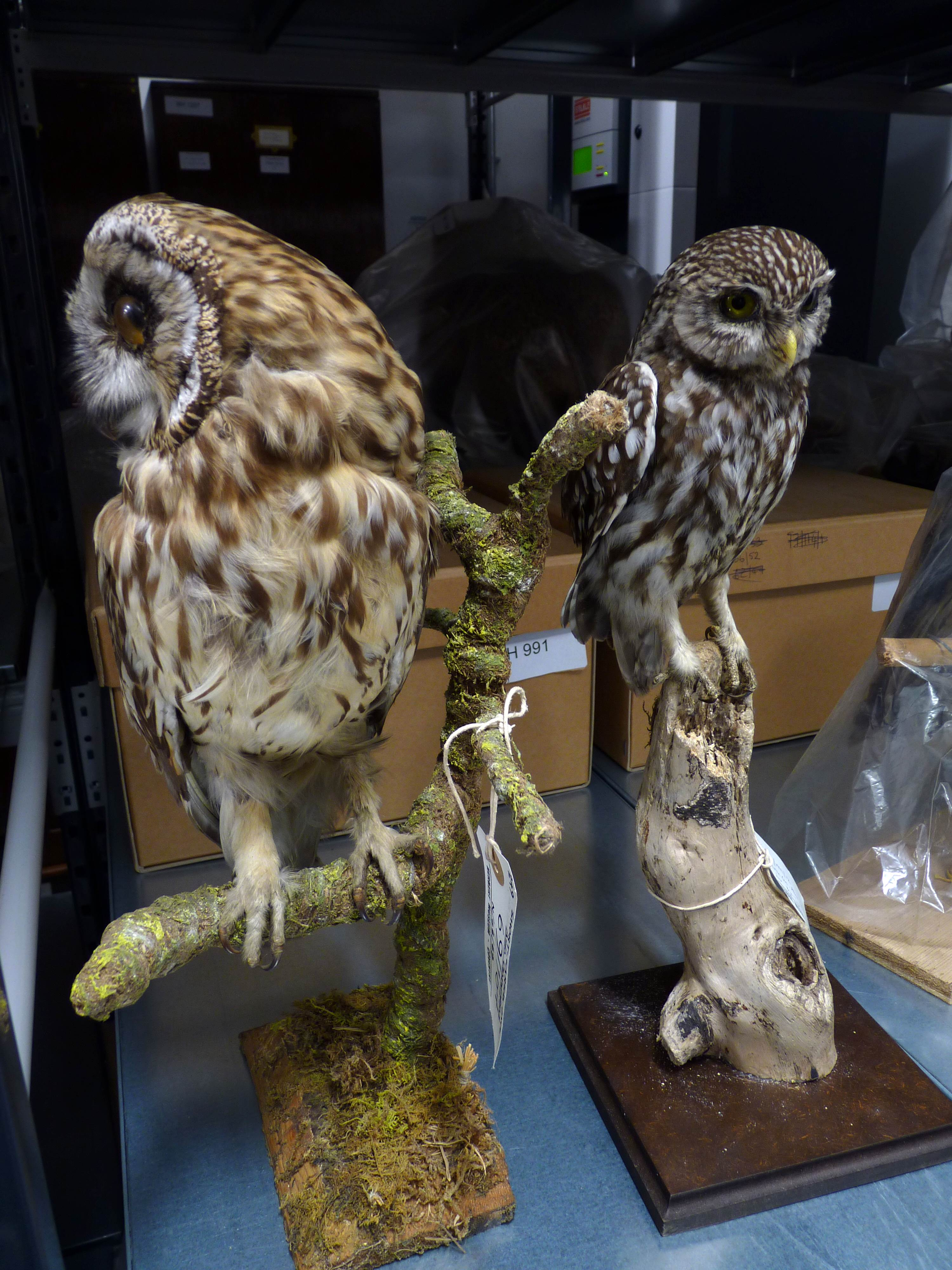
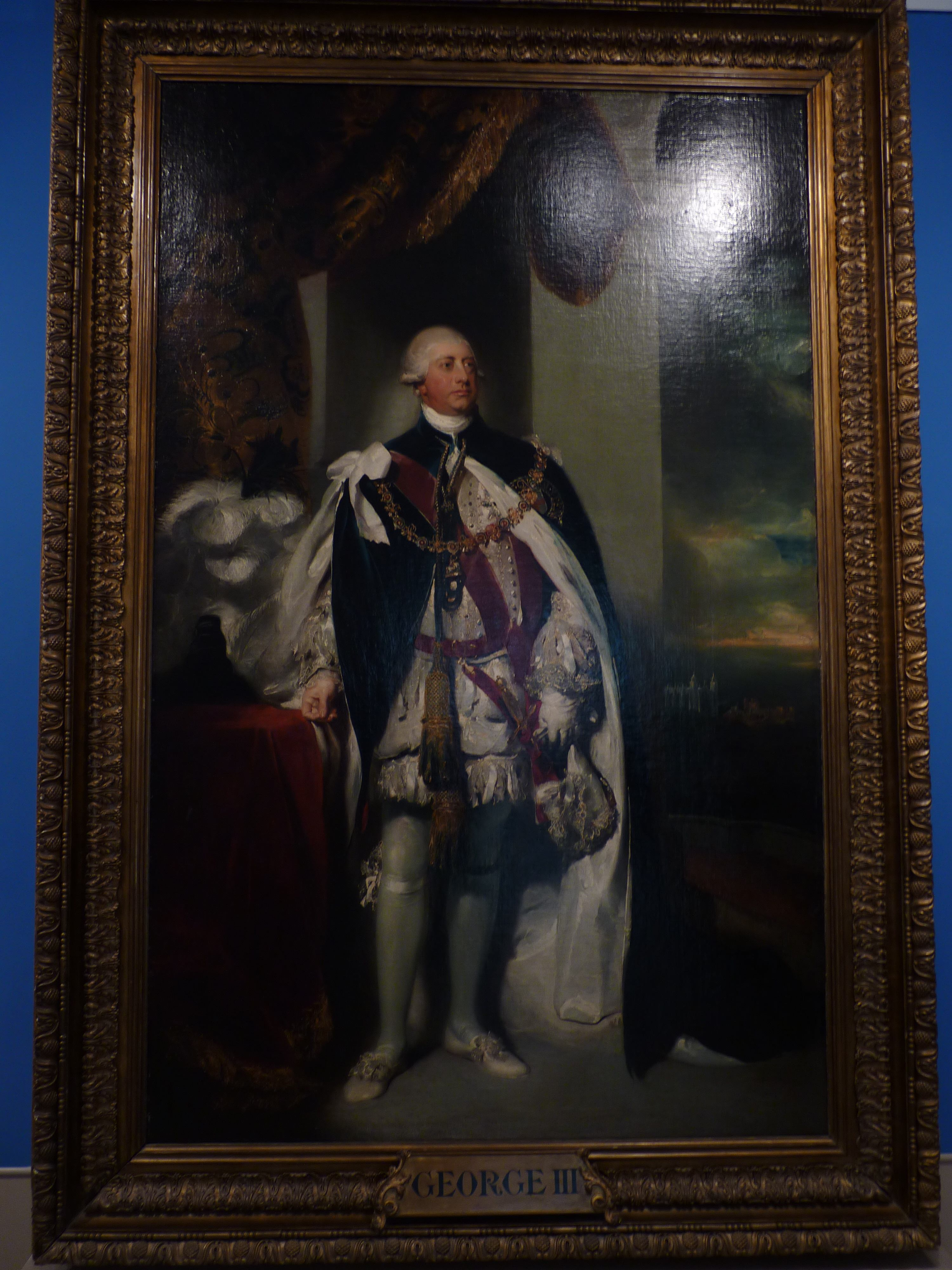
The museum's collections range from taxidermy to Old Masters' paintings.

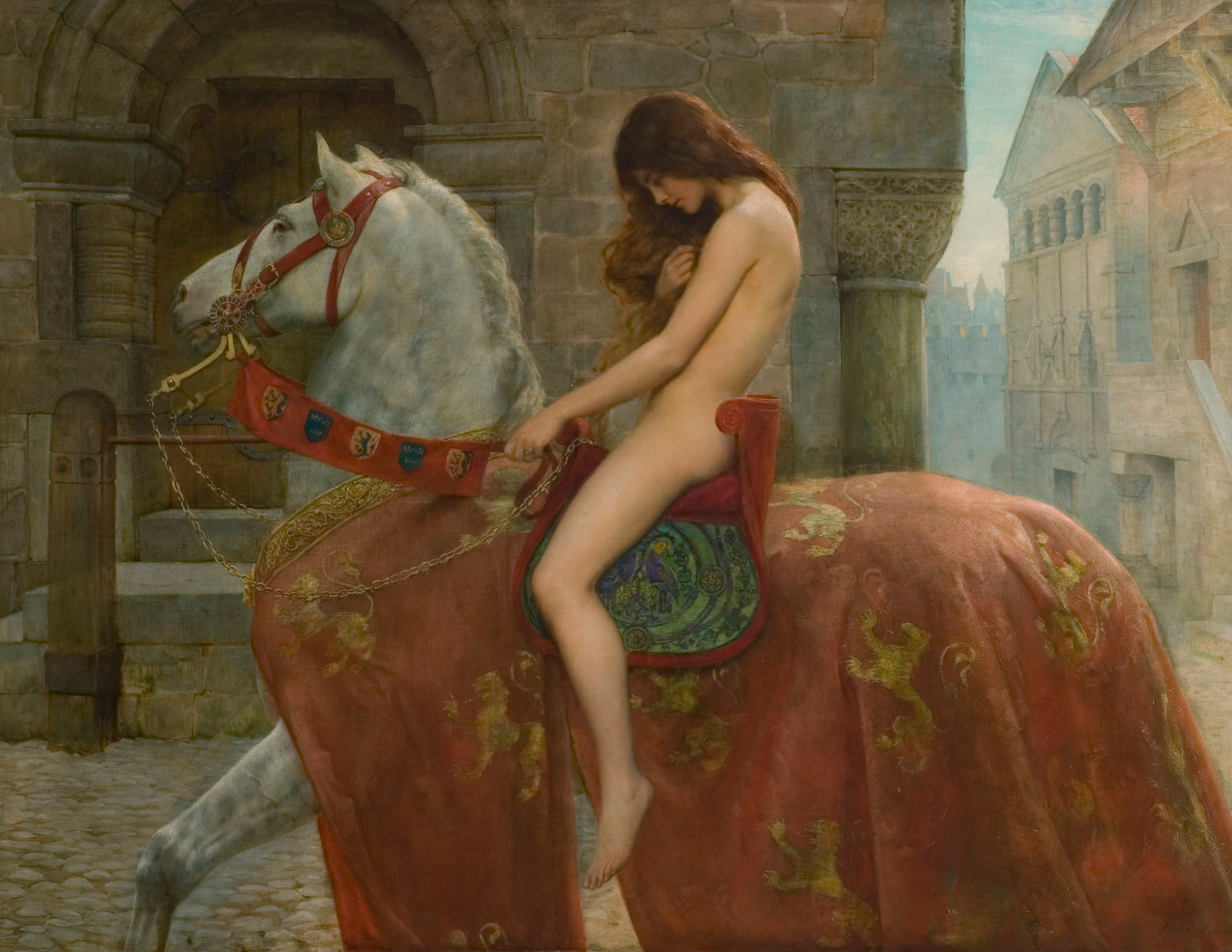
Lady Godiva, 1897, by John Collier.

Permanent gallery spaces include Sculpture, Old Masters paintings, Art Since 1900, Godiva, Social and Industrial history, and Elements (Natural History).

The museum's notable collections include a costume collection dating from around 1800 to date, with the emphasis on nineteenth-century women's wear. The museum is now concentrating on the acquisition of more modern clothes and items from different ethnic communities in Coventry.

Another collection represents the city's history as a centre for ribbon making, which includes over 250 sample books, as well as woven Stevengraphs – a form of silk picture and bookmark, together with dyer's samples, documents, woven badges and related machinery.

The Heritage Lottery Fund granted nearly £200,000 to The Herbert and Wolverhampton Art Gallery in 2008 for acquisitions in relation to the theme of peace and reconciliation.

In 2011, the museum raised £12,000 to buy The Coventry Album, a collection of paintings by William Henry Brooke in 1819. The album is one of the most important collection of historic pictures of Coventry.

=== Other heritage sites ===
Culture Coventry is a charitable trust that also administers three other local heritage sites:

- Coventry Transport Museum is a motor museum, located in Coventry City Centre, England. It houses a collection of British-made road transport. It is located in Coventry because the city was previously the centre of the British car industry. There are more than 240 cars and commercial vehicles, 100 motorcycles, 200 bicycles.
- The Lunt Roman Fort is located in Baginton, about 3 miles from Coventry city centre, where there is a modern partial reconstruction of the fort that was established there in AD 60.
- The Old Grammar School is a Grade I listed building in Coventry, England on the corner of Bishop Street and Hales Street.

== Coventry Archives ==
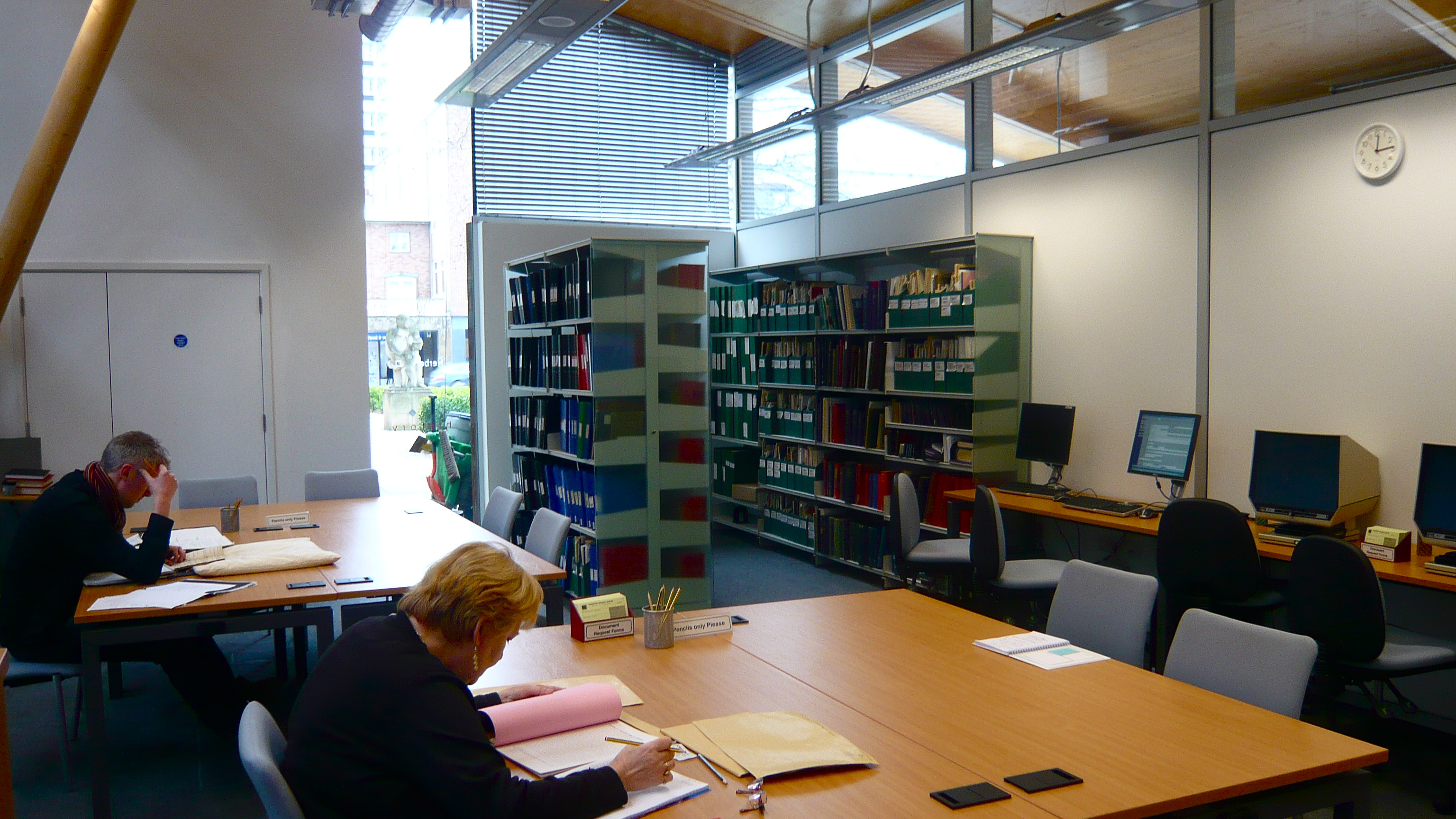
Researchers in the Coventry Archives.

Coventry Archives is housed in The Herbert. Made up of what was the Coventry archives and Coventry local history, it houses the largest collection of records related to Coventry and its history. including the Charter of Incorporation of the City of Coventry, Coventry City Council records.

In 2018 Coventry Archives was re-branded from the previous name, Coventry History Centre.

== Temporary exhibitions and special projects ==
In 2005, The Herbert hosted a theatre project for children, showing them what it would have been like to be evacuees in the 1940s. The event won two awards, one for excellence in the field of heritage and the other for engaging children with history.

There are four temporary exhibition spaces, and the temporary exhibition programme includes exhibitions from national and international galleries such as The British Museum, V&A, Southbank Centre and Natural History Museum. Self-created exhibitions also explore local themes and social history.

In 2009, the Herbert hosted a collection of fifty watercolours from British artists such as J. M. W. Turner and Dante Gabriel Rossetti.

In 2010, to celebrate the fiftieth anniversary of the museum's opening, the Herbert held several events throughout the year. In March more than 1,000 people attended a special event where ten objects, including a sixteenth-century tapestry and Shakespeare's ring, illustrating the history of Warwickshire, were put on display.

In 2018, the Herbert hosted two major exhibitions. PLAY was an exhibition created in collaboration with the video game studio, Rare, and featured the history of the company's games. There was also a large section dedicated to the types of play that humans partake in. There was also a fad wall where visitors were encouraged to write their favourite fads. Visitors praised the exhibition for its intractability and emphasis on having fun inside the exhibition space.

The second major exhibition in 2018 was the ARTIST ROOMS: Anselm Kiefer. One of Germany's most significant post-war artists, Kiefer's work explores themes of national identity and collective memory.

In 2020, as part of the Exploring Eliot project celebrating the 200th birthday of author George Eliot, the Herbert collaborated with Coventry University to explore Eliot's legacy and create films on her life and work. Students were selected primarily from the Faculty of English and were given an opportunity to work with museum collections, objects, artworks, archives and rare pieces from Eliot's personal life. The project was then adapted into a module and integrated into the English degrees at Coventry University and students in the coming years will be able to avail the opportunity as well.

== Gallery ==
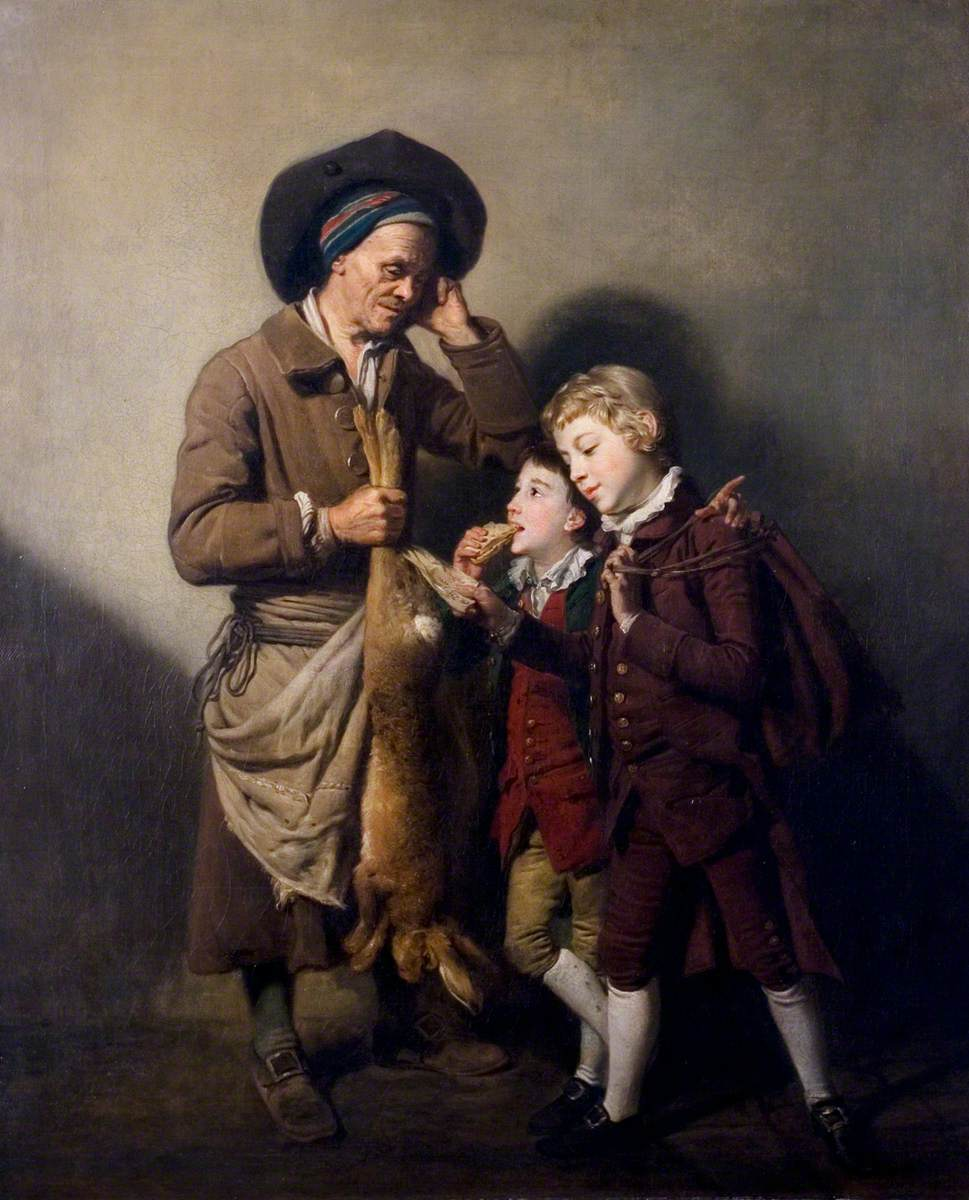
The Porter and the Hare by Johan Zoffany, 1768

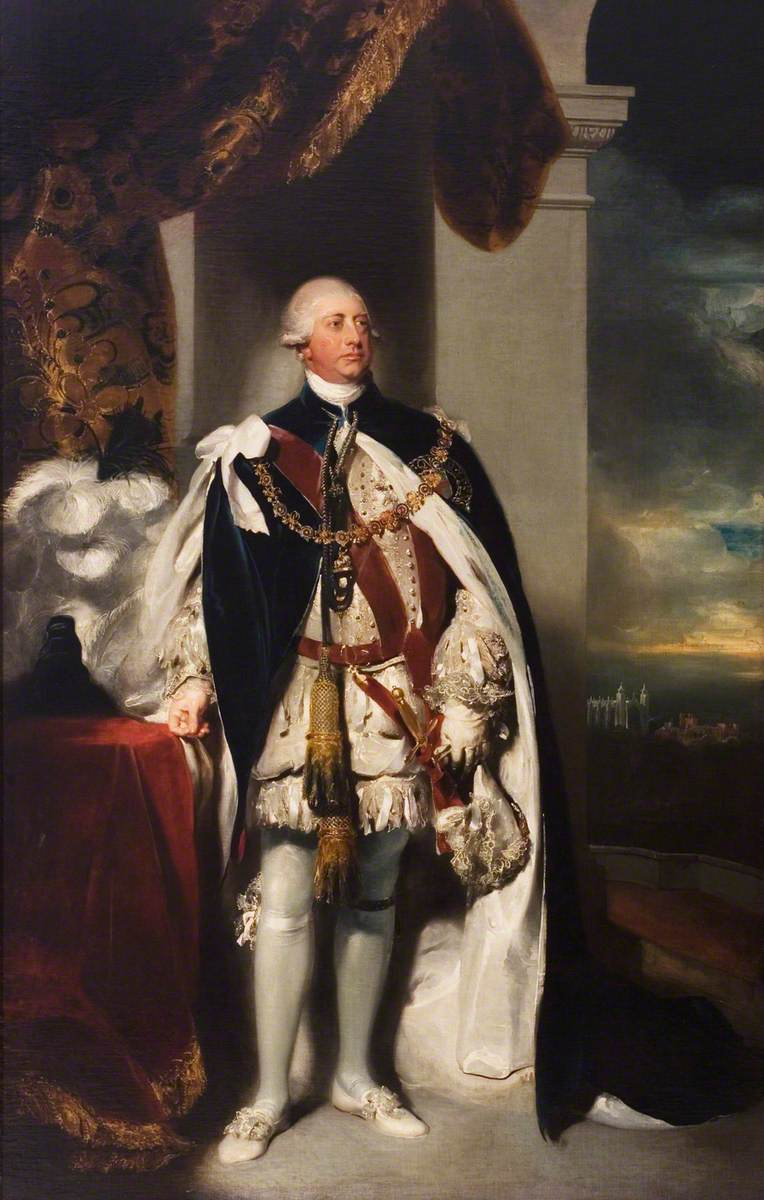
Portrait of George III by Thomas Lawrence, 1792

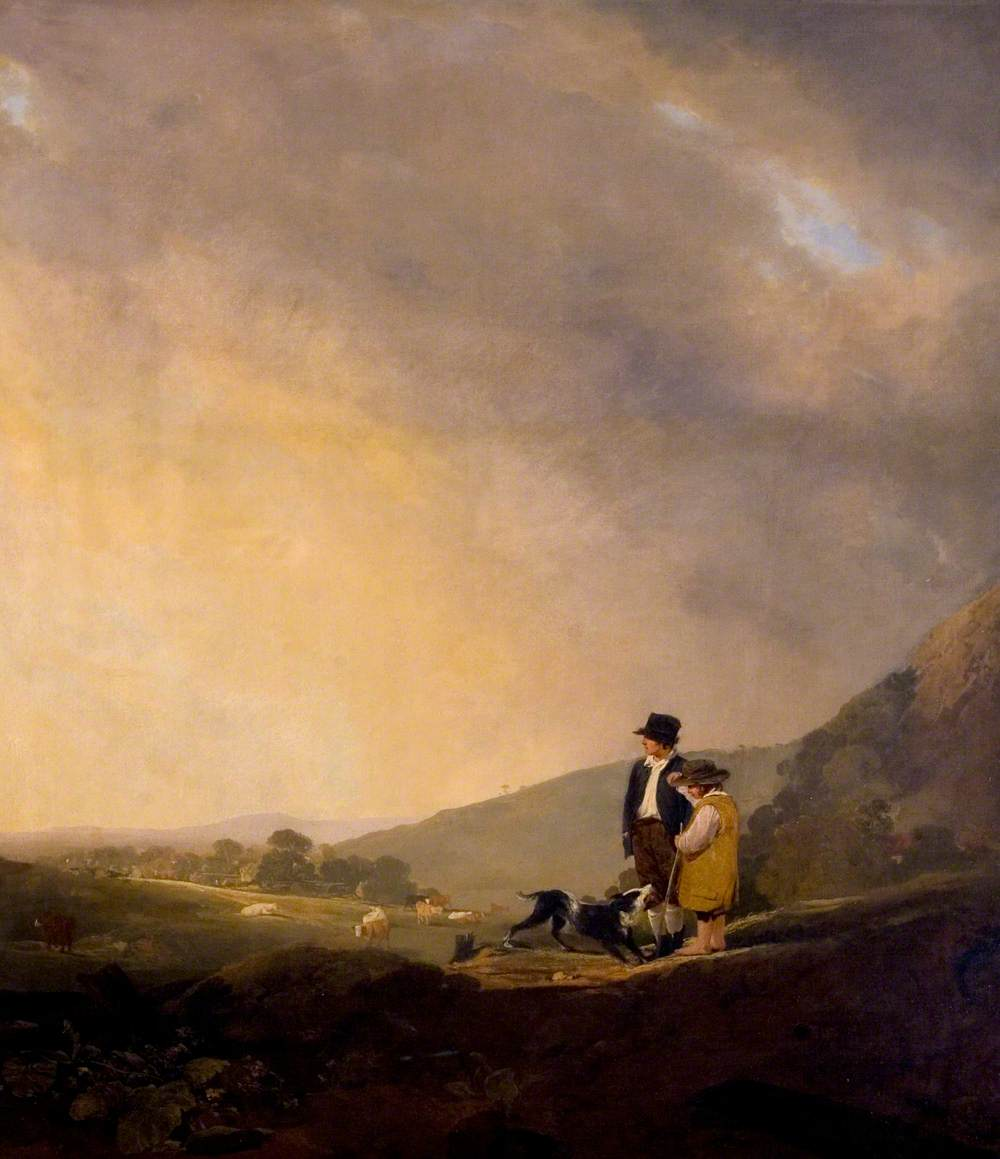
Cow Boys by Augustus Wall Callcott, 1807

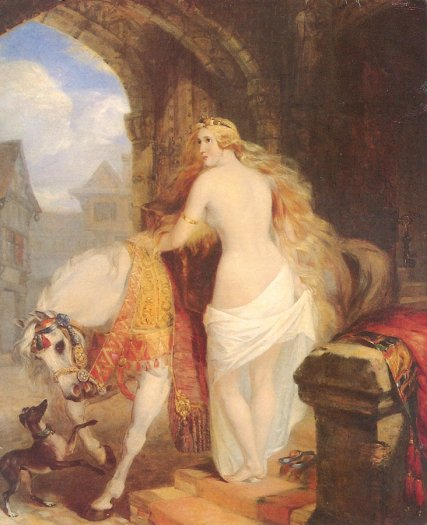
Lady Godiva by Marshall Claxton, 1850

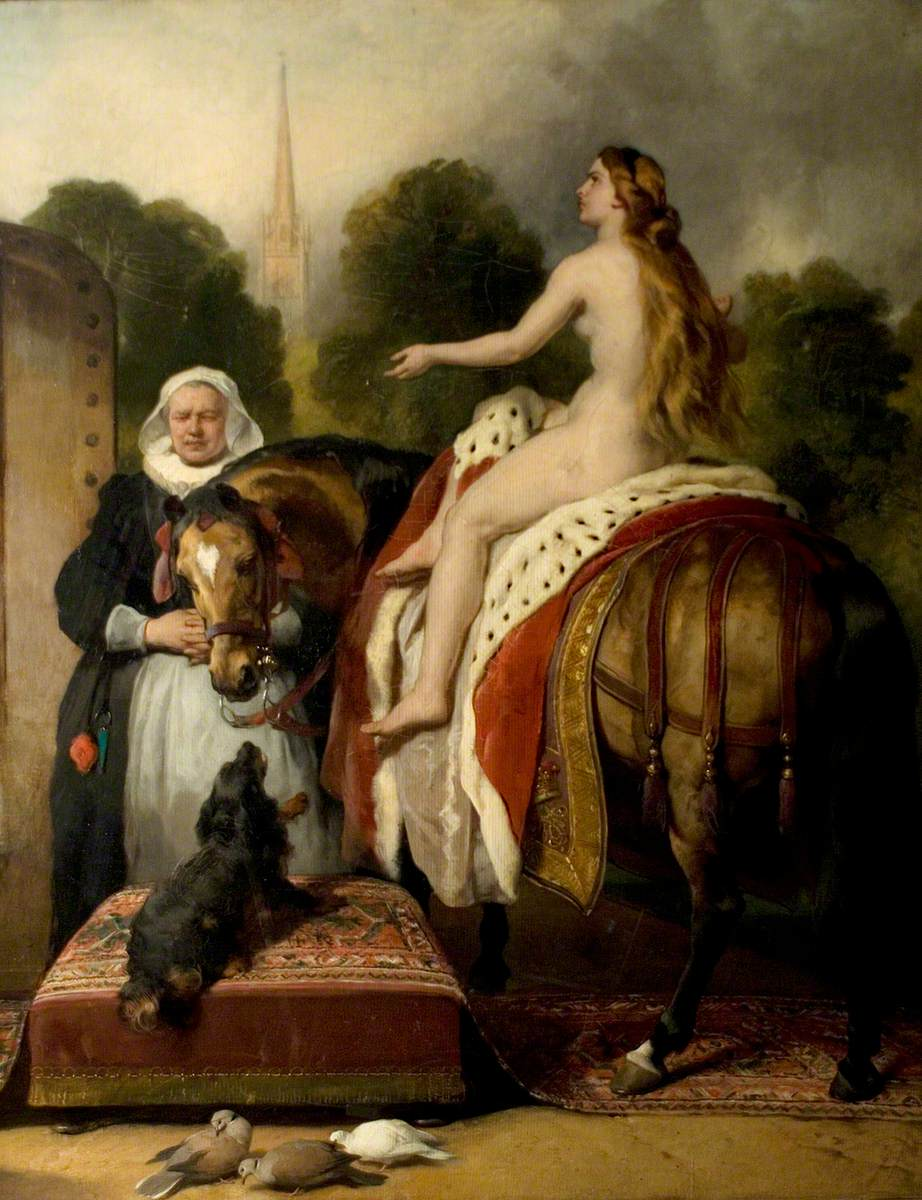
Lady Godiva's Prayer by Edwin Landseer, 1865

== Bibliography ==
- Cane, Simon (June 2010). "Renaissance West Midlands: Collections". Museums, Libraries & Archives. Archived from the original (PDF) on 28 September 2011.
