= Adelaide Claxton =

British painter, illustrator, and inventor

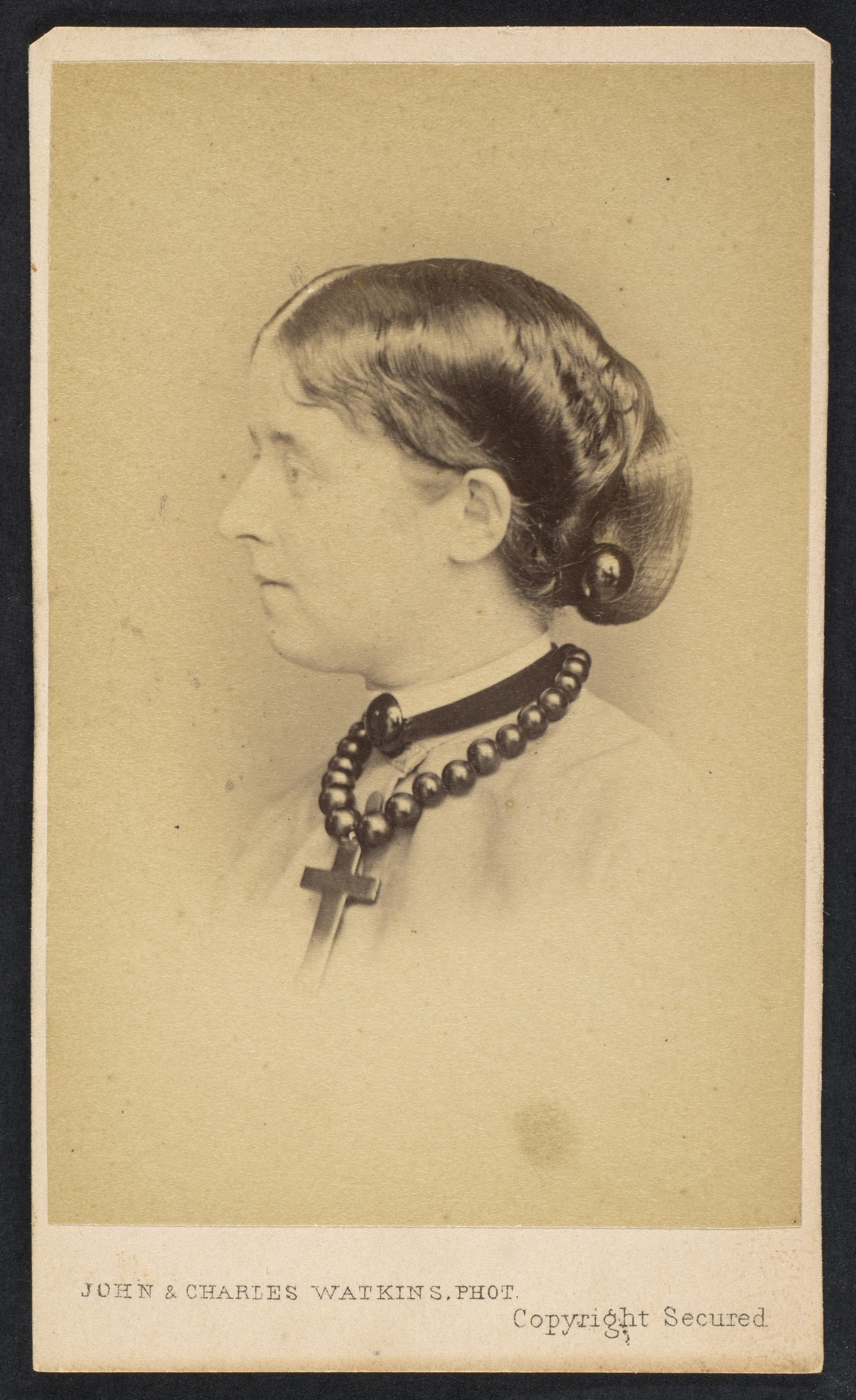

Adelaide Sophia Claxton (10 May 1841 – 29 August 1927) was a British painter, illustrator, and inventor. She was one of the first women artists to make a major part of her living through the commercial press, selling satirical and comic illustrations to more than half a dozen periodicals.

== Personal life ==
Claxton was born in London, one of two gifted daughters of the British painter Marshall Claxton; both Adelaide and her sister Florence followed their father in becoming painters. However, she did not share her father's taste for large oil paintings. She studied art at Cary's School in the Bloomsbury area of London, where she began to focus on figure painting in watercolor.

In 1850, she traveled with her family to Australia, where she remained for four years before returning to England by way of Calcutta, India.

== Career ==
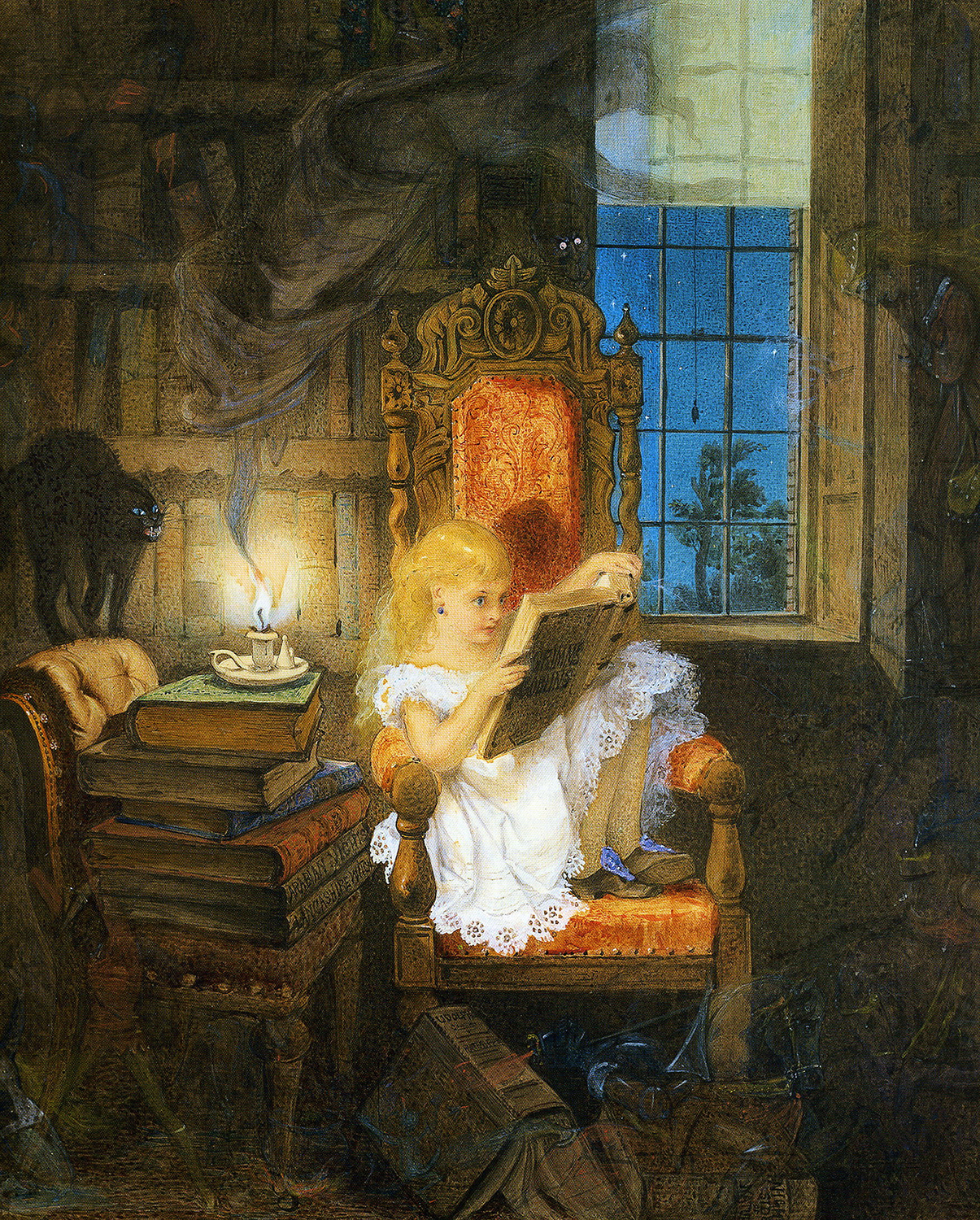
Adelaide Claxton, Wonderland.

Claxton's paintings combine scenes of domestic life with literary or fantasy elements like ghosts and dreams. She began exhibiting her work in the late 1850s at the Society of Women Artists, and between then and 1896 exhibited multiple times at the Royal Academy of Arts, Royal Hibernian Academy, and Royal Society of British Artists, as well as the Society of Women Artists. One of her works, A Midsummer Night's Dream at Hampton Court, was so popular that she ended by painting 5 copies of it; another, Little Nell, she copied 13 times. Wonderland, a painting showing a little girl reading tales from the Brothers Grimm by candlelight, is much reproduced. The English painter Walter Sickert based his oil painting She Was the Belle of the Ball [After Adelaide Claxton] on one of her works.

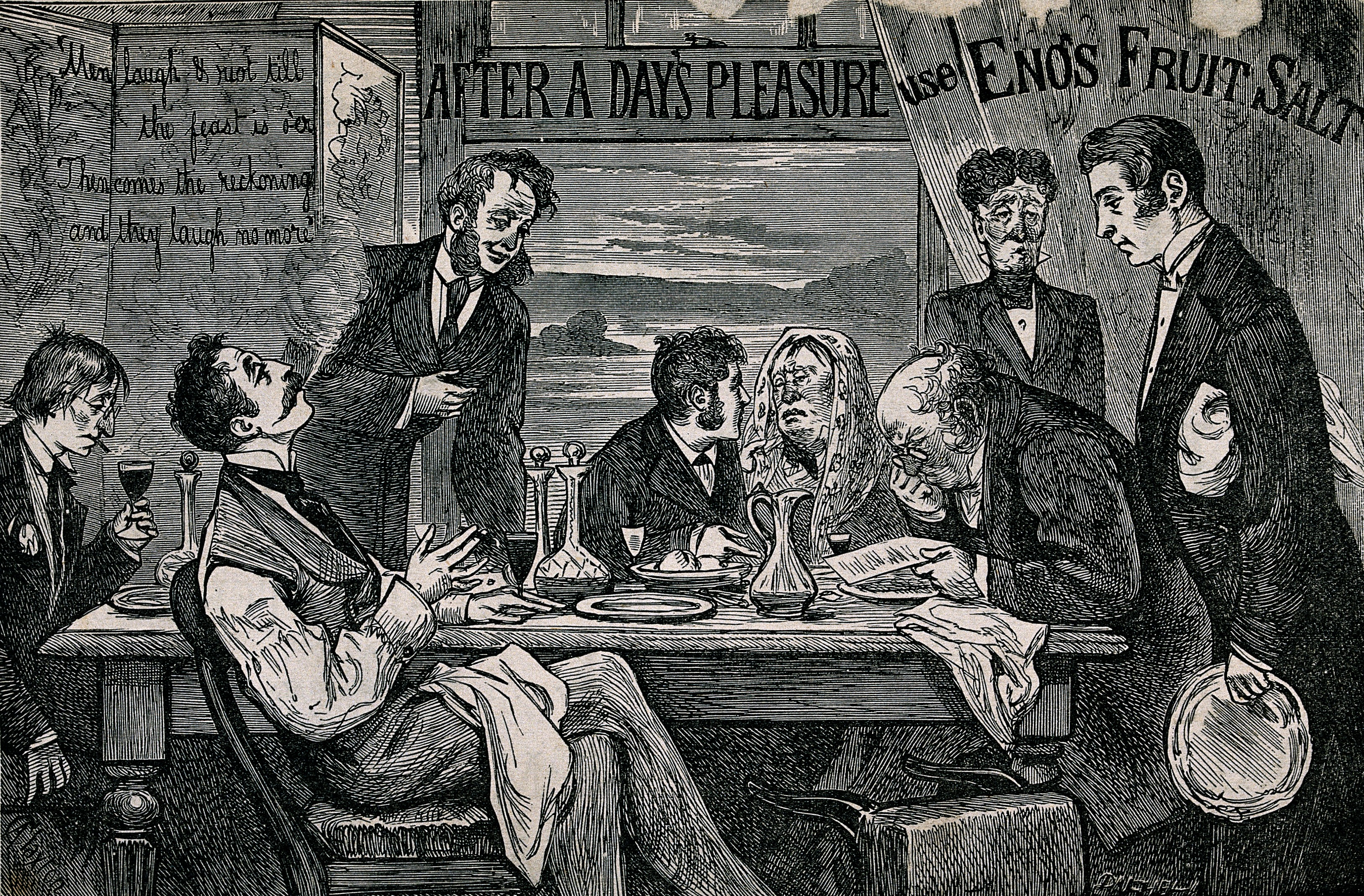
An advertisement for Eno's Fruit Salt; wood-engraving after Adelaide Claxton.

Claxton earned her living in part through her paintings and in part by selling comic illustrations and satirical drawings of high society to popular magazines like Bow Bells, The Illustrated London News, London Society, Judy (where she was one of the chief illustrators), and several others. She was one of the first British women artists to work regularly in the magazine market, where she was paid on the order of £2–7 per illustration. As early as 1859, the Illustrated Times featured her painting The Standard-Bearer on its cover. Claxton also authored two illustrated books, A Shillingsworth of Sugar-Plums (1867; puzzlingly advertised as containing "several hundreds of Num-nums and Nicy-nicies") and Brainy Odds and Ends (1904; a compendium of mottoes and the like).

Claxton's work is in the collection of the Walker Art Gallery, Liverpool, and other arts institutions.

== Personal life and inventions ==
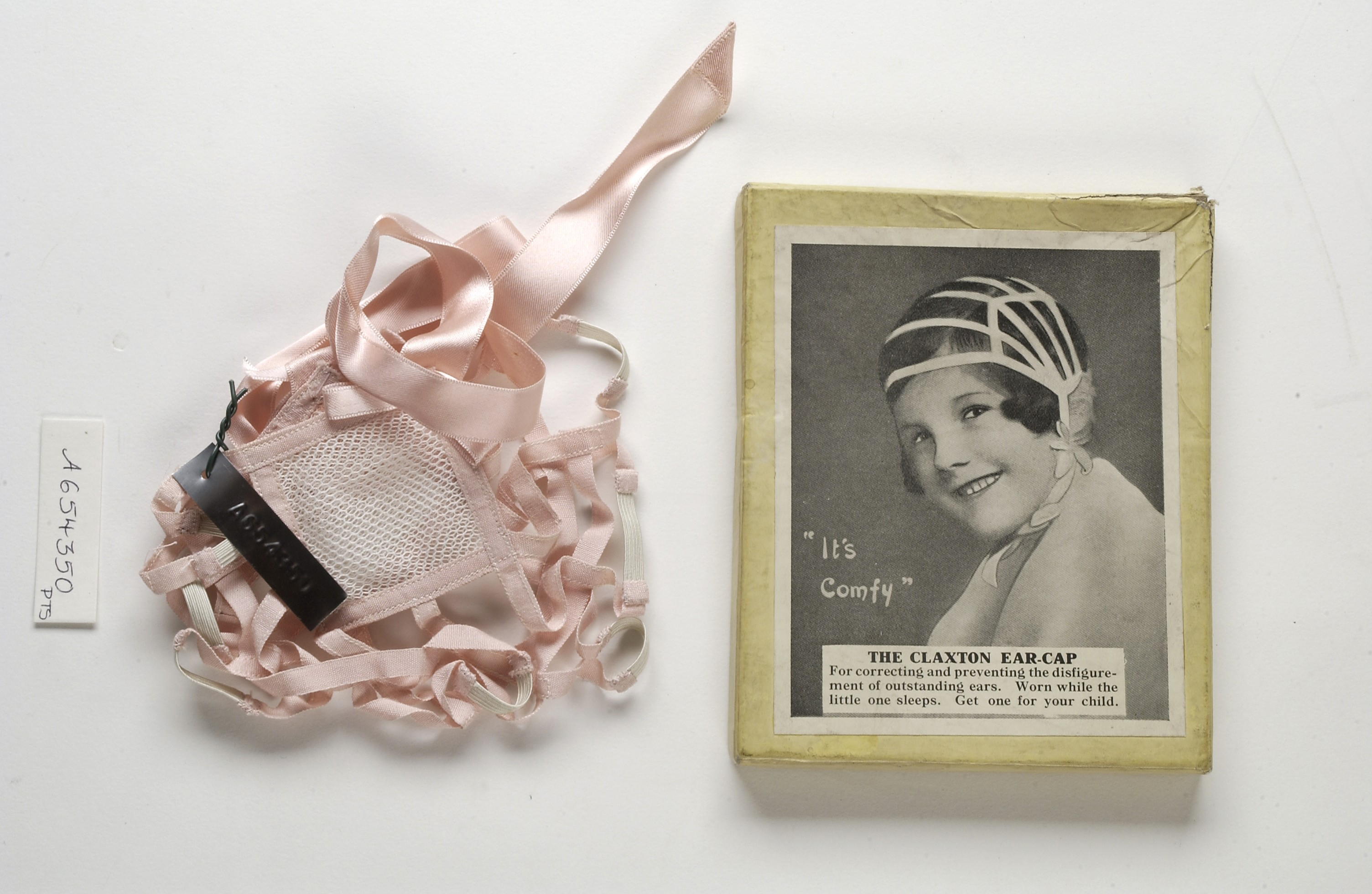
Adelaide Claxton's patented 'Ear-cap'.

In 1874, Claxton married George Gordon Turner, an event that effectually ended her career as an illustrator. The couple settled in Chiswick and had a son. Claxton turned her interest to invention, and in the 1890s several patents were registered under her married name of Adelaide Sophia Turner. One of these was for an "Armpit-Crutch for Bed-Rests and Chair-Backs". Another was for "Ear-caps for outstanding ears" (i.e., ears that stuck out).
