= Janis Claxton =

Australian choreographer (1964–2018)

Janis Claxton (6 October 1964 – 7 September 2018) was an Australian choreographer based in Edinburgh, Scotland.

== Early life ==
Claxton started dance training in Brisbane at the age of 3, and went on to gain a BA in Performing Arts (Contemporary Dance) at Queensland University of Technology. As a young dancer, she worked with Erick Hawkins, whom she continually cited as an influence and upon whose techniques she built much of her practice.

== Career ==
In 2003 she formed Janis Claxton Dance in Bristol, then moved to Scotland in 2005. In 2008 her Herald Angel Award-winning Enclosure 44-Humans, part of the Edinburgh Festival Fringe, involved her and other dancers in a site-specific work at Edinburgh Zoo where they performed for 11 days in an animal enclosure. Since 2009 Claxton spent much of her time in China performing, teaching and working on cultural projects.

In 2013 she was awarded an International Creative Entrepreneur placement in China.

== Pop Up Duets ==
Her award-winning POP-UP Duets (fragments of love) was described as "the choreographic stand-out" of the 2016 Edinburgh Festivals. It comprised a series of 5-minute love duets performed in the galleries of the National Museum of Scotland.

In 2018, Janis Claxton Dance embarked on a world tour of POP-UP Duets (fragments of love). Although London remained elusive, Claxton received international recognition, with venues including Jacob's Pillow Dance Festival and the Lincoln Centre in New York.

== Legacy ==
Claxton died peacefully in the early hours of 7 September 2018, aged 53, having been recently diagnosed with lung cancer. On 20 August 2018, she received a special Archangel award from The Herald for her sustained and valued contribution to the Edinburgh festivals over the years. A leading campaigner for gender equality in UK contemporary and classical dance programming, and consistent advocate for promoting Scottish Arts abroad – especially in the Far East – Claxton said on Facebook in August 2018:

I have done a lot for Scottish Dance but #popupduets clinched it and shattered that ceiling. I wish for more female choreographers to get THEIR well deserved chances. The work will change and evolve and become more rich deep meaningful and no more rag doll flingings of disembodied disempowered women being chucked about by men [...] NO EXCUSES. NO NO NO EXCUSES! There simply are none.
