= A Converted British Family Sheltering a Christian Missionary from the Persecution of the Druids =

Painting by William Holman Hunt

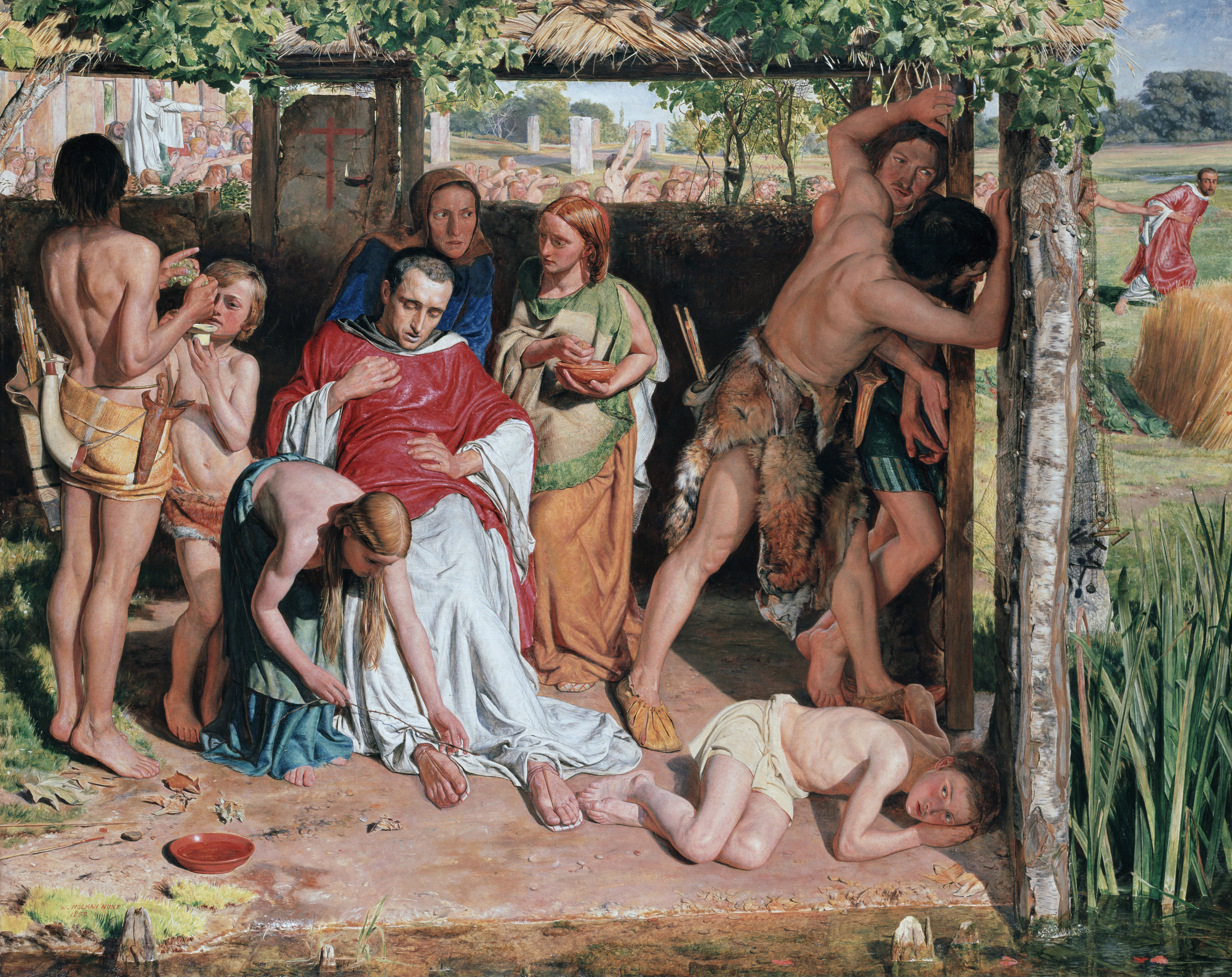
- Artist: William Holman Hunt
- Year: 1849–1850
- Medium: Oil on canvas
- Dimensions: 111 cm × 141 cm (44 in × 56 in)
- Location: Ashmolean Museum, Oxford

A Converted British Family Sheltering a Christian Missionary from the Persecution of the Druids is a painting by the English artist William Holman Hunt that was exhibited at the Royal Academy in 1850 and is now in the Ashmolean Museum in Oxford. It was a companion to John Everett Millais's Christ in the House of His Parents. Both artists sought to depict similar episodes from very early Christian history, portraying families helping an injured individual. Both also stressed the primitivism of the scene.

== Subject ==
Hunt's painting depicts a family of ancient Britons occupying a crudely constructed hut by the riverside. They are attending to a missionary who is hiding from a mob of pagan British Celts. (Note: The model for the woman bathing the missionary's face is Elizabeth Siddall.) A Druid is visible in the background on the left pointing towards another missionary, who is being taken by one of the mob.

A stone circle with stone lintels (as at Stonehenge) and an avenue lined with standing stones (as at Avebury) are noticeable in the background but are visible only through gaps in the back of the hut used by the Christian family. The contrast between Christian and Druidic symbols is identified by the painting of a red cross over a stone within the Christian family's hut.

The presence of the druid presumably locates the intended period of the scene before the Roman conquest of Britain in the mid-1st century, making the missionaries very early ones indeed, although the vestment-like clothes that they wear would, even to the well-informed Victorian, suggest a much later period.

== Reception ==
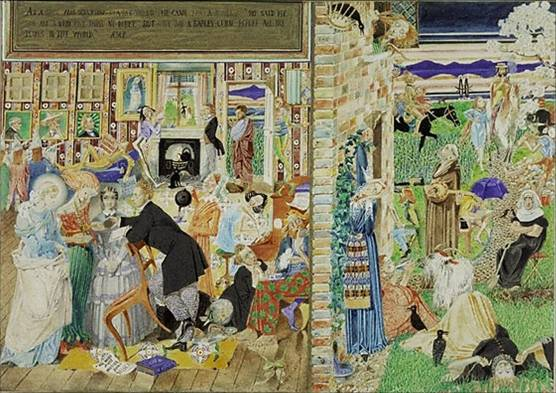
Florence Claxton's The Choice of Paris: An Idyll (1860), a satire on the Pre-Raphaelites

Hunt's painting was less controversial than Millais's companion piece, but Hunt was still heavily criticised for the odd composition and the contorted poses of the figures. In 1860, Florence Claxton's painting The Choice of Paris: An Idyll parodied the composition of Hunt's picture along with other works by the Pre-Raphaelite artists of the previous years.

Hunt himself continued to believe it to be one of his best works. In 1872, referring to the painting as "the Early Xtians", he wrote in a letter to Edward Lear, stating that "sometimes when I look at the Early Xtians I feel rather ashamed that I have got no further than later years have brought me, but the truth is that at twenty – health, enthusiasm and yet unpunished confidence in oneself carries a man very near his ultimate length of tether".
