= Florence Claxton =

British painter (1838–1920)

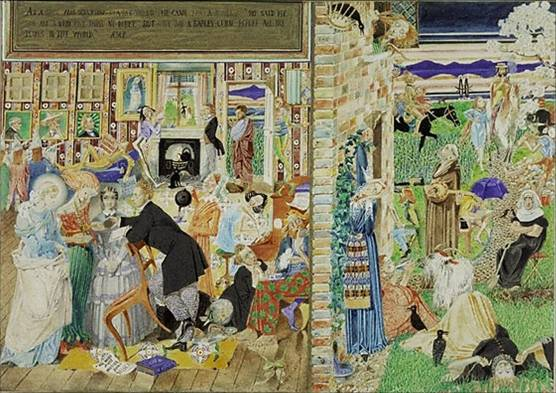
Claxton's The Choice of Paris, a satire on the Pre-Raphaelites

Florence Ann Claxton (26 August 1838 – 3 May 1920), later Farrington, was a British artist and humorist, most notable for her satire on the Pre-Raphaelite movement. Claxton also wrote and illustrated many humorous commentaries on contemporary life.

== Biography ==
Claxton was named after the city of her birth, Florence, Italy, where she was born on 26 August 1838 to painter Marshall Claxton and his wife, Sophia (née Hargrave); she was baptised 2 January 1839 at St Alfege Church, Greenwich. She had a younger sister, Adelaide, born three years later.

Struggling as a painter, Marshall Claxton emigrated with his family in 1850 to Australia, where his brother-in-law Richard Hargrave had established himself as a settler in New South Wales. Other family members emigrated as well, including Lawrence Hargrave, who became an aeronautical pioneer. Claxton's arrival in Sydney was celebrated in the newspapers, but he once again struggled to find the fame he desired. The family moved on yet again in 1854, this time to India. After a three-year stay, the family returned to England via Ceylon and Egypt in 1857. The experience of international travel proved to be formulative to the sisters as artists, "both expanding the geographic scope of their subject matter and equipping them with something of an outsider's perspective on Victorian society."

Back in London, both sisters found work in the production of engravings for the popular press, while continuing also to work on paintings. In 1858, Florence exhibited her painting Scenes from the Life of a Female Artist in the second annual show of the Society of Women Artists. In the following year, 1859, she signed a petition advocating the admission of women to the Royal Academy Schools, and exhibited her Scenes of Life of an Old Maid in the Society of Women Artists show. In 1860, Florence illustrated Married Off: A Satirical Poem, by "H. B."

In 1864, the sisters were apparently sharing a home together in London, but their paths separated. On 1 June 1868, Florence married Ernest Farrington, a French photographer and engineer, in Paris. Little is known of their married life, but Florence claimed to have lived in Monaco for some years. There were no children from the marriage and she was widowed likely by 1881, when she was back living alone with her father in London.

Florence did not remarry and was later estranged from her sister. She continued to work as an illustrator and artist. On 3 May 1920, at her home, Grafton House in Sandown, Isle of Wight, she died by suicide by taking a fatal overdose of veronal "in a carefully planned suicide."

== The Choice of Paris ==
Claxton's best-known work is The Choice of Paris: An Idyll (c. 1860), a satire on, and parody of, the works of the Pre-Raphaelite artists of the previous years. The painting is patterned after William Holman Hunt's A Converted British Family sheltering a Christian Missionary from the persecution of the Druids, and combines caricatures of many of the main figures of the movement, including John Ruskin and Sir John Everett Millais, with figures of popular culture like P. T. Barnum, and allusions to the great artists of the past. It depicts Millais in the role of Paris, offering the golden apple to a scrawny-looking medieval woman, ignoring a Raphael madonna (copied from The Marriage of the Virgin) and a modern woman in crinolines. The painting also includes parodies of other Pre-Raphaelite works, including Millais' Sir Isumbras at the Ford, Spring: Apple Blossoms and The Vale of Rest. It also caricatures Calderon's Broken Vows and Windus's Burd Helen. The picture was reproduced as a full-page wood-engraving by the Illustrated London News on 2 June 1860.

== Other works ==
Other examples of Claxton's works were also reproduced in newspapers of the day. In Utopian Christmas, reproduced in the Illustrated London News of 24 December 1859, the poor - barefooted and raggedly-dressed - are shown feasting at a lavish banquet and being served and entertained by the rich - depicted as generals, nobles, and finely-dressed ladies.

Other works by Claxton include the painting Women's Work: A Medley (1861; Manchester Art Gallery: 2024.18) and Scenes from the Life of a Governess (1863). Women's Work may have been a feminist riposte to Ford Madox Brown's painting Work, which focused on men's labors but neglected women.

Florence Claxton married a "Mr. Farrington, of Romsey," in 1868, but continued to work and exhibit at least sporadically afterward.

Claxton also wrote humorous skits on feminism and women's rights, most notably in The Adventures of a Woman in Search of her Rights, a story in cartoon form. In the book, a young woman falls in love with a dashing youth, but her parents do not approve and her lover leaves. She decides to pursue her rights. She loses her looks through the study of John Stuart Mill and; now made ugly, she pursues various careers, becoming a lawyer, a politician and a doctor, but eventually fails in all of her pursuits. She finally emigrates to the United States and marries Brigham Young, the polygamous Mormon leader. In the end, it turns out to have been all a dream and she ends with the words "thank goodness it's only a midsummer night's dream and I'm not emancipated."
