= Claxton Castle =

Castle in the United Kingdom

- Claxton, Norfolk, England
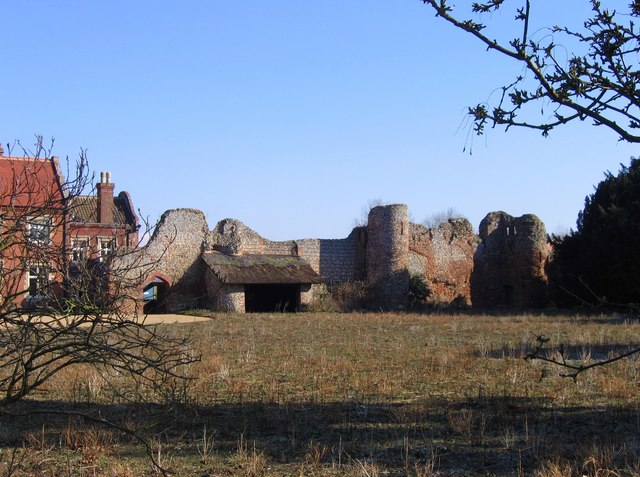
- Claxton Castle ruins

Site information
- Condition: Ruined, outer wall and tower survives

Location
- Shown within Norfolk
- Location within Norfolk
- Coordinates: 52.5818°N 1.4451°E
- Grid reference: grid reference TG335038

Site history
- Materials: Brick, flint and limestone.

Claxton Castle in the village of Claxton, Norfolk, is a ruined brick castle some 13 km southeast of Norwich.

== Details ==
Sir William de Kerdeston and his son were given licence to crenellate the castle in 1340 and 1376 respectively, the latter licence necessary due to Kerdeston's death before completion of the castle. It was largely demolished in the 17th century to build Claxton Hall. The castle ruins consist of a long wall and three towers with various staircases and archways. Earthworks indicate an outer moat and causeway dating from medieval times. It is a Grade II* listed building first listed in 1951 and is a scheduled monument.

== See also ==
- Castles in Great Britain and Ireland
- List of castles in England
