= Ducan's Marsh =

Protected area in Claxton, Norfolk, England

Coordinates: 52.572°N 1.450°E

- Site of Special Scientific Interest
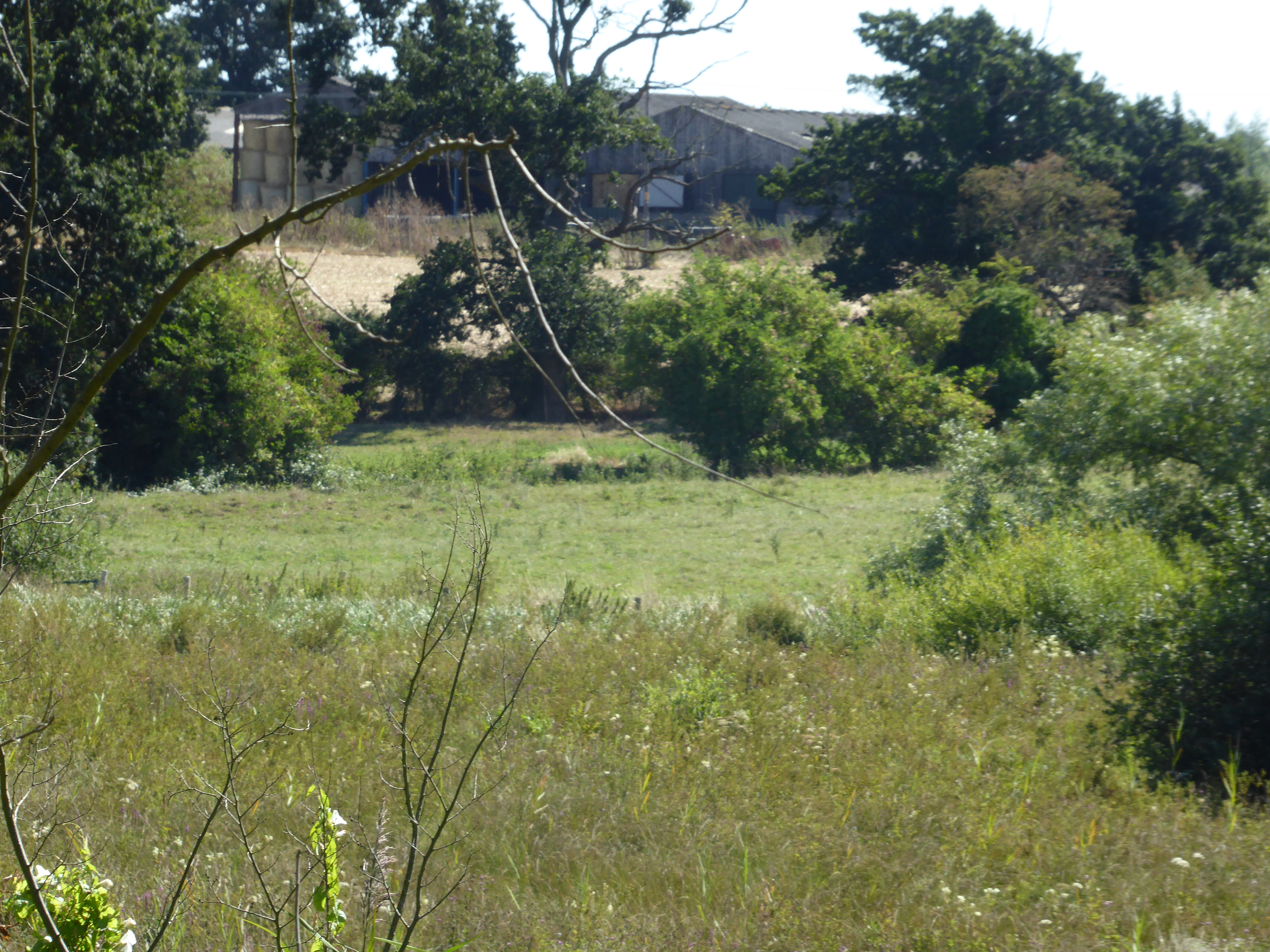
- Location of Ducan's Marsh.
- Area of search: Norfolk
- Grid reference: TG 339 027
- Interest: Biological
- Area: 3.6 hectares (8.9 acres)
- Notification date: 1986
- Location map: Magic Map

Ducan's Marsh is a 3.6-hectare (8.9-acre) biological Site of Special Scientific Interest north-east of Loddon in Norfolk, England. It is part of the Broadland Ramsar site and Special Protection Area, and The Broads Special Area of Conservation.

This unimproved area of wet grassland is in the valley of Carleton Beck, a small tributary of the River Yare. There are species-rich fen and fen grassland communities in areas around springs on the side of the valley. The grassland is maintained by light summer grazing and it has a number of uncommon plants.

The site is private land with no public access.
