= Marshall Claxton =

English painter

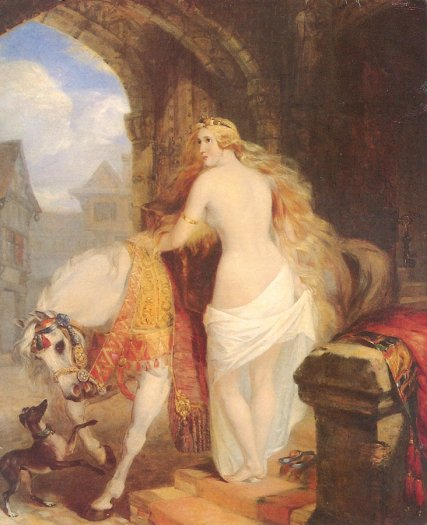
Lady Godiva (1850; Herbert Art Gallery and Museum, Coventry).

Marshall Claxton (12 May 1811 – 28 July 1881) was an English subject, genre, landscape and portrait painter.

== Life ==
Claxton was born in Bolton, Lancashire, the son of a Wesleyan Methodist minister, the Rev. Marshall Claxton, and his wife Diana. Marshall studied under John Jackson, R.A., and at the Royal Academy school where he enrolled on 26 April 1831. He married and had two daughters, Adelaide and Florence Claxton, both of whom became artists in their own right.

His picture "Suffer little children to come unto me" was described in Household Words as 'the first important picture' painted in Australia.

He died on 28 July 1881, in London.

Paintings by Claxton have been held in the Royal collection, Derby Art Gallery, and Herbert Art Gallery in England, as well as the Dickinson collection in the Art Gallery of New South Wales. His work has also been displayed in St. Paul's College, University of Sydney, and The King's School, Parramatta. He was also known for his depictions of Wesleyan and Methodist subjects, made popular as prints.

== Sources ==
- Macmillan, David S.: Claxton, Marshall (1813 - 1881), Australian Dictionary of Biography, Volume 3, MUP, 1969, pp 424–425.
