= Joseph Gutteridge =

- Born: 23 March 1816; Coventry, Warwickshire, England
- Died: 4 November 1899 (aged 83); Coventry, Warwickshire, England

Joseph Gutteridge (23 March 1816 – 4 November 1899) was an English silk weaver, microscopist and naturalist.

== Life ==
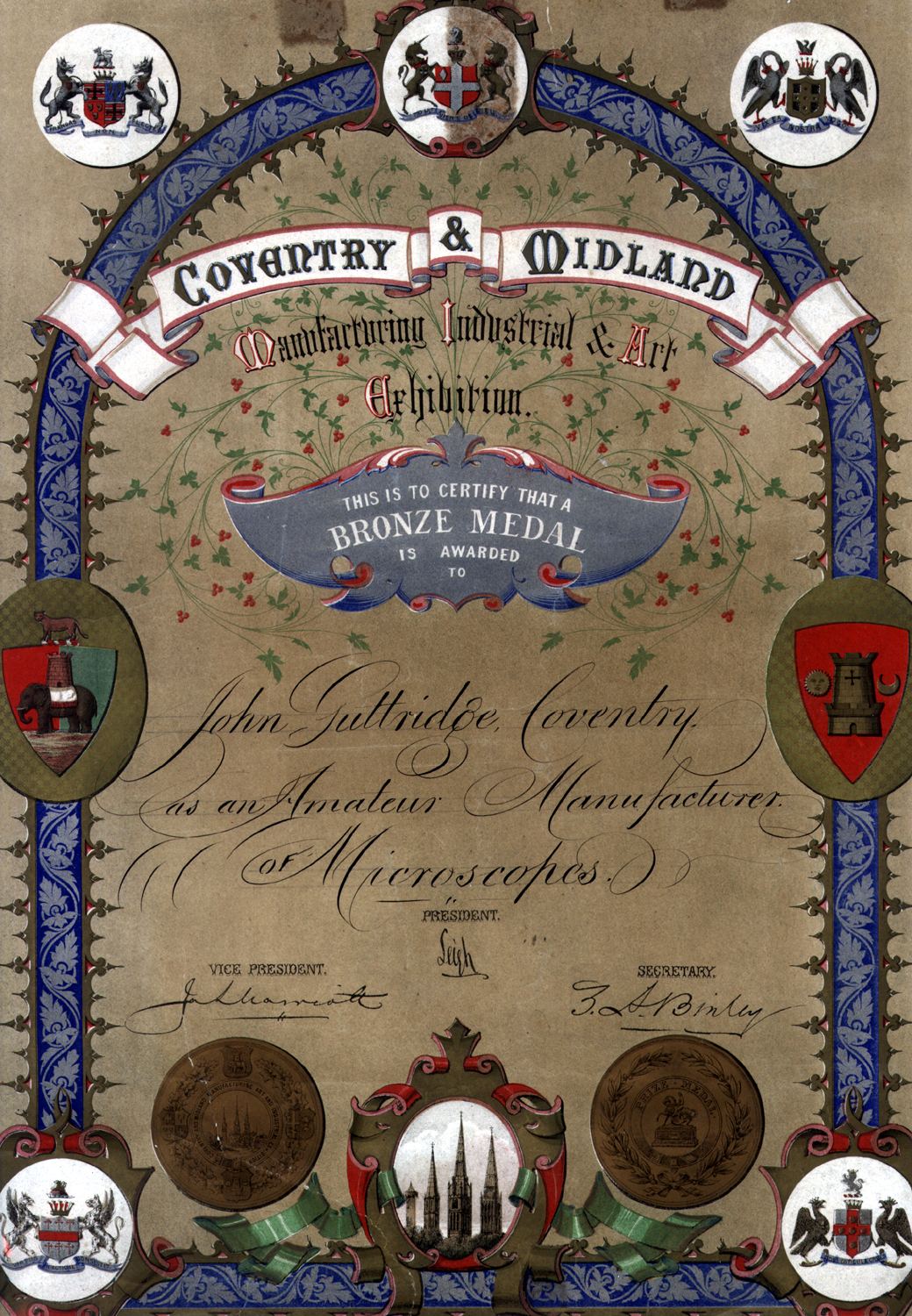
Certificate certifying award of a bronze medal to Joseph Gutteridge as an amateur manufacturer of microscopes

Gutteridge was born in 1816 in Coventry, Warwickshire. His father had served in the British Army during the Napoleonic Wars and settled in Coventry. Gutteridge started his career as an apprentice silk weaver and later became a repairer of Jacquard looms. He also worked for the weaver Thomas Stevens, the inventor of stevengraphs, and became a pioneer of silk brocades in five colours.

Gutteridge became an atheist after attending debates at the Coventry Mutual Improvement Society, and became an Owenite socialist. After participating in the strike of 1860–61 in the aftermath of the Cobden–Chevalier Treaty, he acquired "firm Liberal views". Despite being ruined by the Treaty, he was "dogmatically committed to free trade as the poor man's best hope".

He became interested in geology and in 1867 he was awarded a bronze medal at the Coventry & Midland Manufacturing, Industrial & Art Exhibition for the manufacture of microscopes.

In 1893 his autobiography Lights and Shadows in the Life of an Artisan was published, which was drawn from his diary. It "remains an impressive source for the history of the silk industry, working-class life, and urban development during the industrial revolution". William Ewart Gladstone received a copy and it gained favourable reviews. Gutteridge received a gift from the Royal Bounty Fund and an annuity from friends.

He died in 1899 in Coventry, Warwickshire, after suffering from a stroke.

== Work ==
Examples of Joseph Gutteridge's work
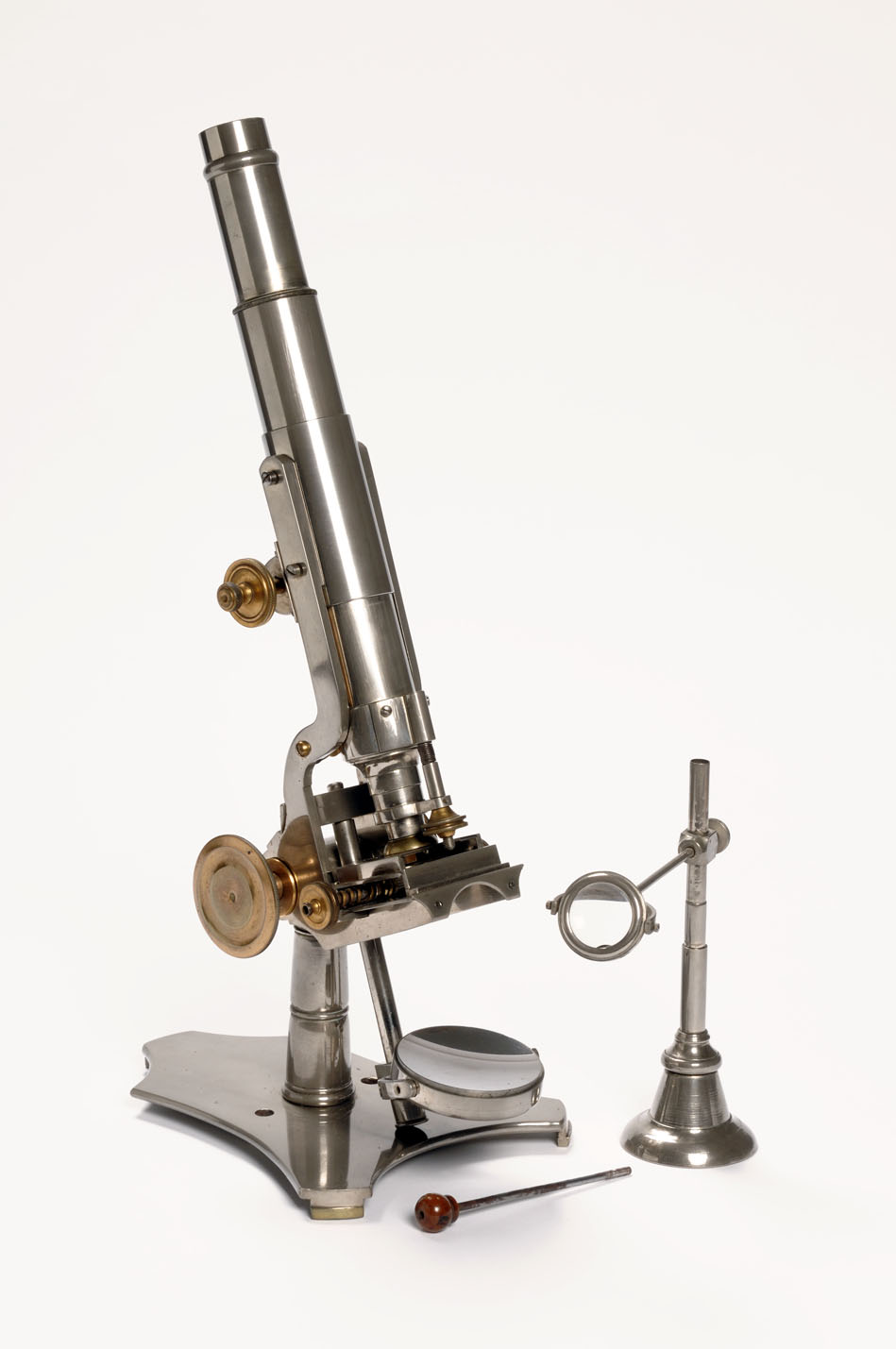
A stand microscope

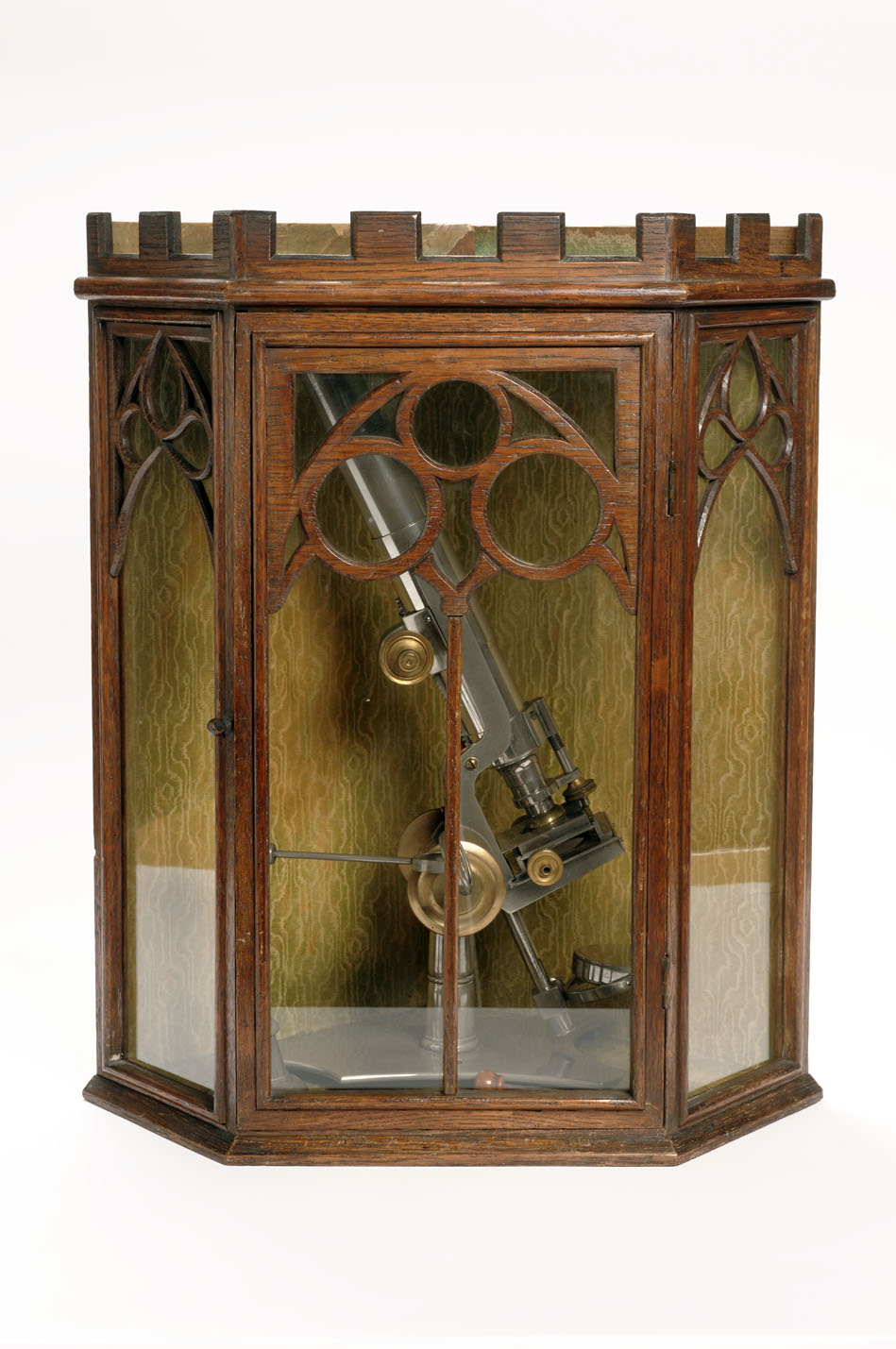
A stand microscope with case
