= Victoriana =

Items from the Victorian period

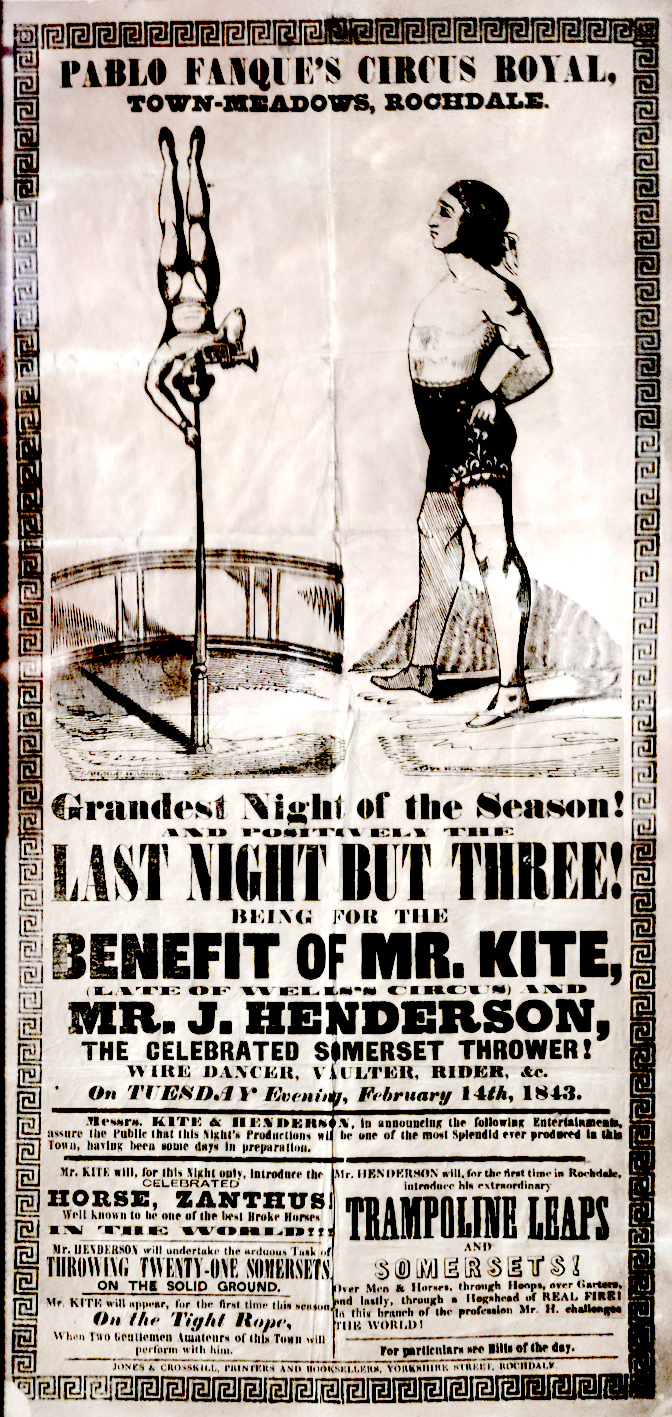
An 1843 Victorian circus poster for the Pablo Fanque Circus, which inspired the 1967 Beatles song "Being for the Benefit of Mr. Kite!", a homage to Victorian circuses

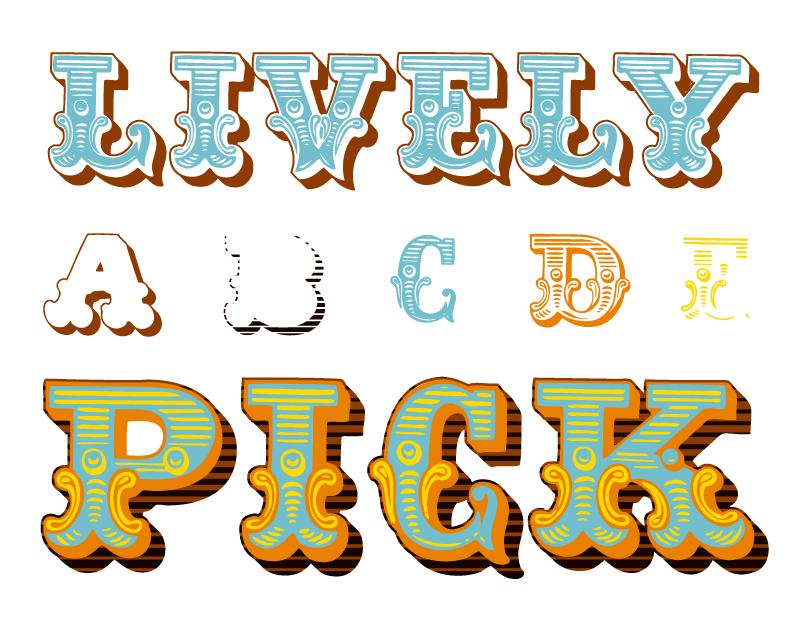
The Dusty Circus font, a commercial font inspired by Victorian circus posters, is an example of Victoriana.

Victoriana is a term used to refer to material culture related to the Victorian period (1837–1901). It often refers to decorative objects, but can also describe a variety of artifacts from the era including graphic design, publications, photography, machinery, architecture, fashion, music, and Victorian collections of natural specimens. The term can also refer to Victorian-inspired designs, nostalgic representations, or references to Victorian-era aesthetics or culture appropriated for use in new contexts.

The term "Victoriana" was coined in 1918, just before a wave of interest in Victorian objects and artifacts began in the 1920s. Another increased period of collecting of Victoriana emerged in the 1950s. In 1951, the Festival of Britain commemorated the centenary of the Victorian era's first world's fair, the 1851 Great Exhibition held at the Crystal Palace.

In the 1960s and 1970s, the eclectic character of Victorian era wood type inspired graphic designers like Seymour Chwast and Push Pin Studios. Items such as Stevengraphs were popular collectable items during the revival of interest in Victoriana in the 1960s and 1970s.

In the 1980s, Margaret Thatcher, then Prime Minister of the United Kingdom, promoted an interest in Victoriana by emphasizing "Victorian family values" as part of a roadmap to cultural, moral, and economic improvement.

== Popular culture ==
In science fiction circles (especially in genres like steampunk), Victoriana is used loosely to describe mock-Victorian worlds, where visual references to the machinery of the Industrial Revolution are incorporated into urban, romanticized pastiches with fantastic creatures and imagined mechanical contraptions.

== See also ==
- Victorian decorative arts
- Victorian fashion
- Neo-Victorian
- Gothic fashion
- Vintage clothing
- -ana
