= NobleWorks =

American publisher of humorous greeting cards

NobleWorks Inc.
- NobleWorks logo
- Type: Private
- Industry: Greeting card publisher
- Genre: Humor publisher
- Founded: 1980
- Founder: Jay Purvis; Christopher Noble
- Headquarters: Hoboken, New Jersey, United States
- Key people: Ron Kanfi (President)
- Products: Greeting cards, stationery, electronic greetings, calendars
- Owner: Ron Kanfi
- Website: https://www.nobleworkscards.com/

NobleWorks Inc. is an American publisher of humorous greeting cards. It publishes and sells paper greeting cards, cards with detachable magnets, lapel-button cards, gift cards, free on-line electronic greeting cards, magnetic memo pads, and note pads. The company was founded in New York, and later moved to Hoboken, and is located in Union City, in northern New Jersey.

NobleWorks develops several lines and licenses properties to other greeting card companies, publishers, and manufacturers. NobleWorks also licenses artwork from various cartoonists and designers who are based in the United States as well as in other countries.

== History ==
NobleWorks was founded in 1980 by Christopher Noble and Jay Purvis. They started the company at the 1980 National Stationery Show in New York City. Noble was the head of a company that painted homes, while Purvis had been a Condé Nast art director. Noble's mother gave them a $400 loan to establish NobleWorks. In Noble's Manhattan kitchen, they created and made available to buyers the company's inaugural batch of "black-and-white graphic art cards". Called "The 10 Best Jokes", the cards touched on subjects like sex and Helen Keller and had questions on the exterior and punch lines on the interior.

Ron Kanfi, who became an employee in 1983, was made a partner in 1987. Purvis left NobleWorks in 1986, and Kanfi and Noble purchased Purvis' ownership in NobleWorks. NobleWorks started its inaugural batch of "Talk Bubbles" cards, which had talk bubbles and humorous messages placed on top of vintage images, in 1985. It had 10 employees in 1992.

When independent merchants began to be displaced by malls in the 1990s, NobleWorks changed its business focus by licensing its content to other products and starting an ecommerce platform to sell the products. In addition to greeting cards, NobleWorks creates and sells calendars, posters, and magnets. NobleWorks created a less risqué "Faux Art line" that is sold by department stores. The product line took famous paintings and embedded Christmas settings into them.

Christopher Noble died in 2001, (Note: Sources report different years for Christopher Noble's death. Gifts & Dec and NJ.com said he died in 2001. The Jersey Journal said he died in 2002.) after which Ron Kanfi purchased the company. Kanfi became the president and creative director of NobleWorks. A couple years following Noble's death, NobleWorks was in debt and underwent a reorganization after it filed for Chapter 11 bankruptcy. It shuttered its warehouse in 2010 and moved to "on-demand printing" of its cards, which led to a higher per card expense but saved the company money since it no longer needed storage space for when it printed more cards than there was demand for.

== Products ==
According to Evie Nagyi of The Jersey Journal, "NobleWorks is dedicated to spreading joy with cutting-edge art and irreverent humor" and its "[c]ard messages range from political to plain silly". The company had 2,000 different cards in 2006. NobleWorks' cards commemorate various occasions such as birthdays, Christmas, and Valentine's Day. It commemorates even fake holidays like Festivus which became more widely known because of the Seinfeld TV series. NobleWorks has a collection of cards inspired by Liberace. Its cards are also inspired by bestsellers like "Bad Cat", a Jim Edgar book. It signed an agreement with Elvis Presley's estate to create cards spotlighting the singer that would become available in 2008. LGBTQ wedding cards had increasing demand in 2016. Roughly 33% of the company's products are sold around Christmas. In 2005, 70% of its cards had licensed photos, while 30% had photos produced by "in-house and freelance artists". NobleWorks commissions cartoonists whose work has The New Yorker, Penthouse and Mad to create designs for the greeting cards. It then sends the cartoons to several dozen wordsmiths who come up with the text. NobleWorks had ceased making cards related to airplanes, bombs, and armaments after the September 11 attacks and needed to attract some of their cards like one that had "a cartoon of a pilot relaxing on a beach, using a walkie-talkie to contact a plane flying overhead. It said, 'Ladies and gentlemen, this is your captain speaking....'"

One popular card showed George W. Bush on his knees at the funeral of Pope John Paul II who is dressed in a crimson grown. Bush, who exudes perplexity, inquires, "What happened to Santa?" Another card depicted a wife who is in bed is retrieving an object from her nightstand, saying, "How dare he falls sound asleep on Valentine's Day. I'll just set his side of the electric blanket on roast!" The card received a Louie Award which The Central New Jersey Home News called "the greeting card industry's equivalent of an Oscar". NobleWorks had received four Louies by 1992. NobleWorks enlisted seven cartoonists to produce content for it in 1992, including the quadriplegic John Callahan. A Callahan card depicted a scene in the desert of three men who are riding horses and find an unoccupied wheelchair. A man says, "Don't worry, he won't get far on foot." NobleWorks created funny cards for interfaith families including one displaying two highway exits: the first has the label "Jews Who Buy Christmas Trees" and the second has the label "Christians Who Think Hanukkah Is a Major Holiday".

A 2007 article noted that every year, the company ceases producing 500 of its card designs while at the same time making available 500 original designs. In the mid-2000s, the cards could be purchased at Barnes & Noble, Papyrus, and Hot Topic locations and on NobleWorks' website where buyers are permitted to personalize the cards. In 2016, the company had 7,000 designs and was producing between 700 and 900 original card designs per year.

== Controversies ==
Writing in The Star-Ledger, Greg Saitz said NobleWorks' cards have mocked "most ethnic, religious and alternative lifestyle groups, as well as some other species". The company has received numerous complaints about its cards for being offensive. The Catholic League advocacy group penned an open letter criticizing NobleWorks for being "arguably the worst offender" in designing greeting cards that depict Christmas in a profane context. NobleWorks framed the letter. Robert E. Ritchie, the executive director of the Catholic group America Needs Fatima, also criticized NobleWorks' religious cards, writing "Among other distasteful and scandalous offerings, NobleWorks has a Mother's Day card showing Jesus walking out of the house and Holy Mary warning him to wear clean undergarments in case He is crucified".

In 2013, Council on American-Islamic Relations's Ahmed Rehab wrote that he found a NobleWorks greeting card in a Chicago store that featured a hijab-wearing doll and the captions "Hope your birthday is a blow out!", "She’ll Love You To Death” and "Pull string for message — if you dare!" The card, which was first released in 2011, parodies "Aamina, the Muslim Doll", which helps children learn how to say "Peace be unto you” and “If God wills it" in Arabic. Mic's Andrea Ayres-Deets criticized NobleWorks, writing, "It is interesting that the card depicts a white child holding the doll while simultaneously giving the impression that the doll is a suicide bomber. This all just furthers the false perception that white people are the primary victims of terrorism or suicide bombings."
