= Stevengraph =

Pictures woven from silk, originally created by Thomas Stevens in the 19th century

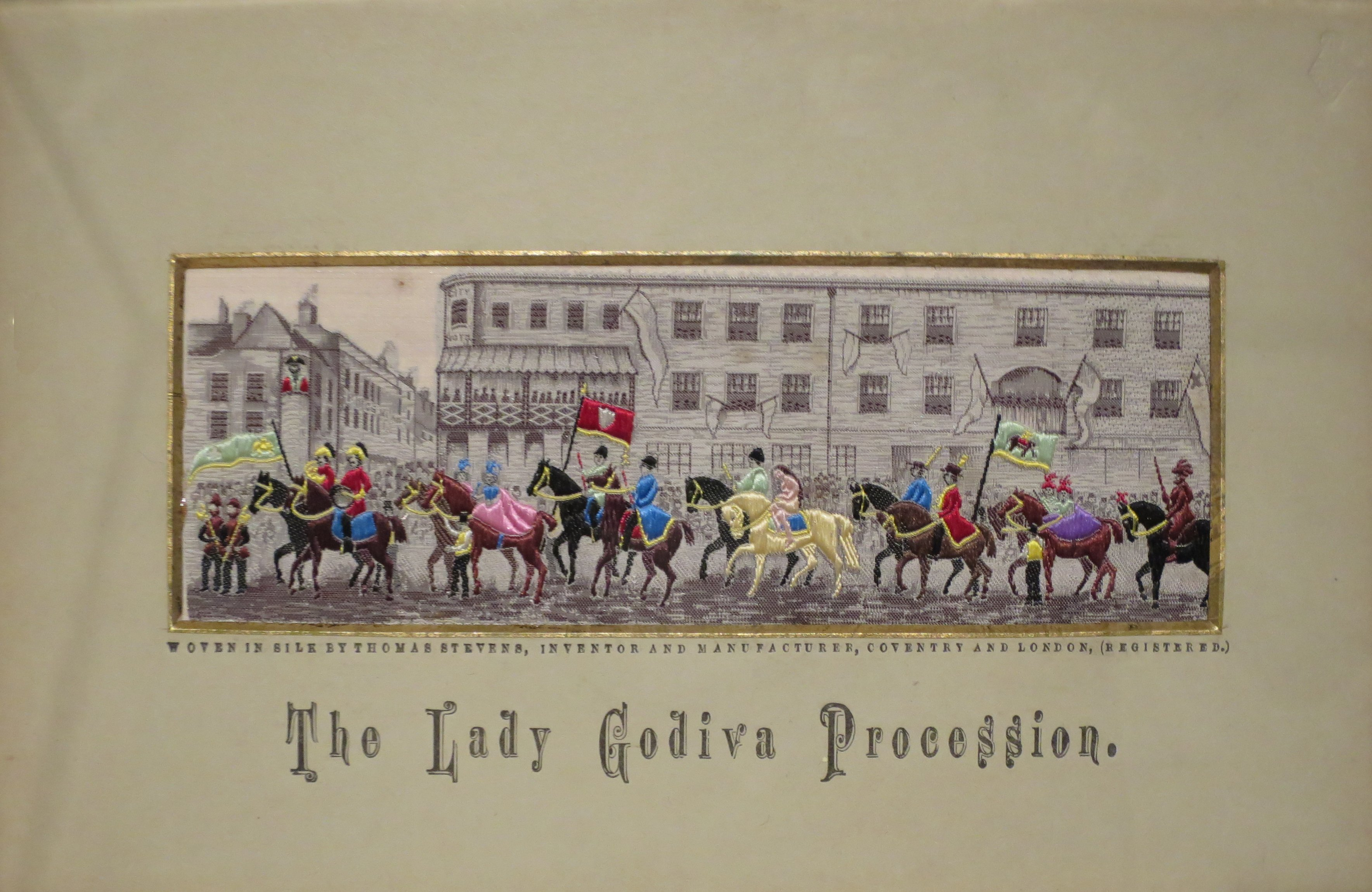
'The Lady Godiva Procession' by Thomas Stevens

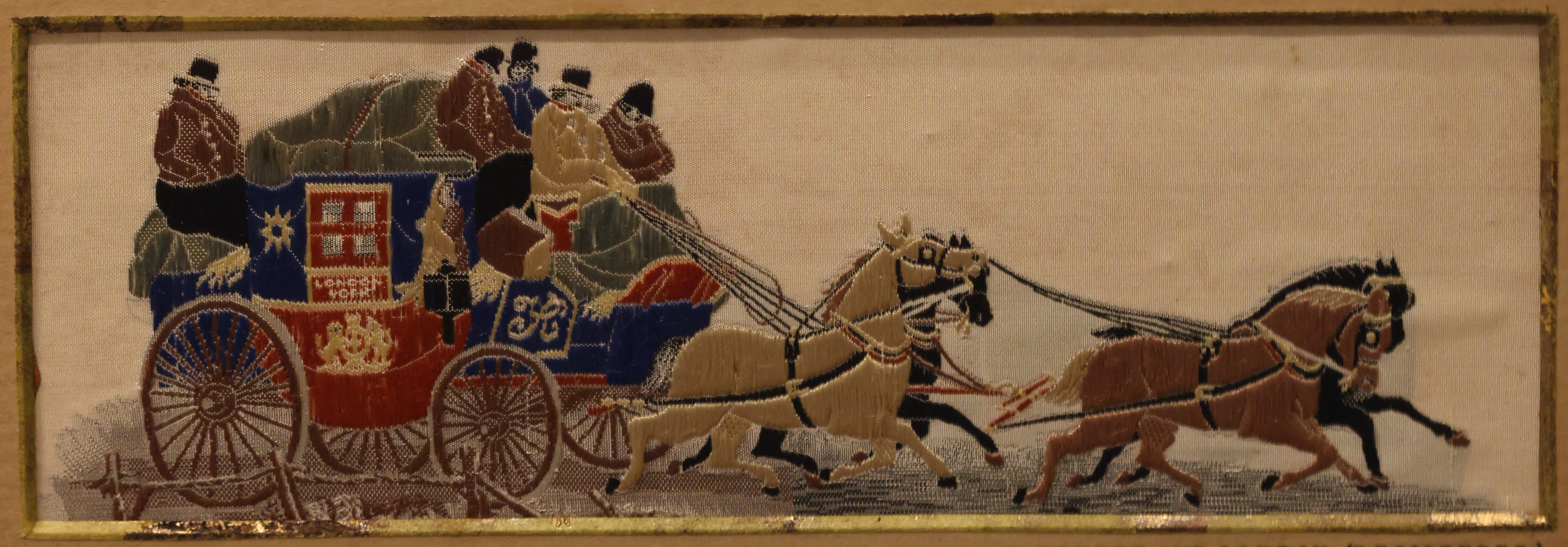
Stevengraph showing the London and York Royal Mail Coach

Stevengraphs are pictures woven from silk, originally created by Thomas Stevens in the 19th century. They were popular collectible items again during the revival of interest in Victoriana in the 1960s and 1970s.

== Detail ==
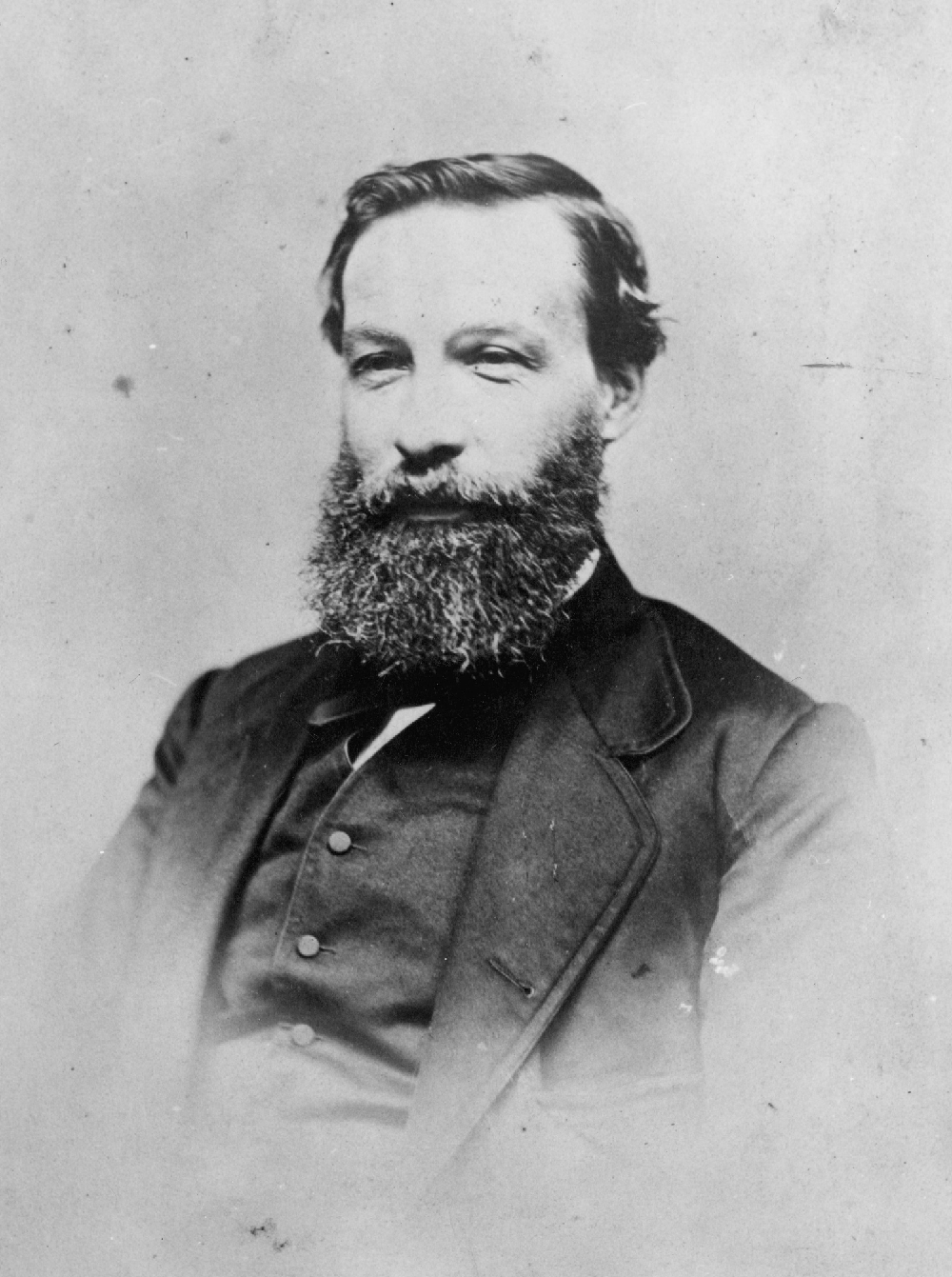
Thomas Stevens in 1888

In the mid-19th century the town of Coventry, England, was the centre of a ribbon weaving industry. In 1860 the Cobden–Chevalier Treaty was signed; this free trade treaty introduced new competition into the industry, leading to a collapse in the local economy.

Thomas Stevens, a local weaver, responded by adapting the Jacquard looms used in Coventry to weave colourful pictures from silk. By 1862, Stevens could produce four different designs and by the late 1880s this had grown to over 900; they became known as "Stevengraphs", after their maker. Many of these designs were used to produce bookmarks, while others were used to make greeting cards and other silk objects.

By the 1930s, Stevengraphs were considered collectable items, but the hobby was considered eccentric and mainly confined to female collectors. During the Second World War Coventry was attacked by German bombers; on 14 November 1940 the Coventry Blitz occurred, destroying the Stevens factory and apparently all records of the Stevengraphs.

In the late 1950s it emerged that Henry Stephens, a descendant of Thomas, had saved one of the pattern books the night before the attack and kept it in safe storage; Henry donated it to the Coventry City Council, who in turn entrusted it with the Herbert Art Gallery and Museum. Stevengraphs became valuable, with more male collectors entering the hobby. Prices rose, particularly for unusual or rarer images less popular during the Victorian period.

Stevengraphs normally measured 140mm x 64mm (5½ x 2½ inches) and were often mounted on cardboard. A printed label on the reverse would indicate that the design was registered and could not be copied. Several other Coventry firms also produced silk-work pictures including W H Grant and Welch & Lambton.

Stevengraphs are held in collections at the Bodleian Library, the Science Museum, the Victoria and Albert Museum and the National Trust property Greenway House, near Brixham, Devon.

== Bibliography ==
- Godden, Geoffrey. (1968) History in silk, The Times, 27 April 1968.
- Wollen, Peter. (2004) Paris/Manhattan: Writings on Art. London: Verso. ISBN 978-1-85984-580-6.
