= Dog ears =

Folded corner in the sheet of paper

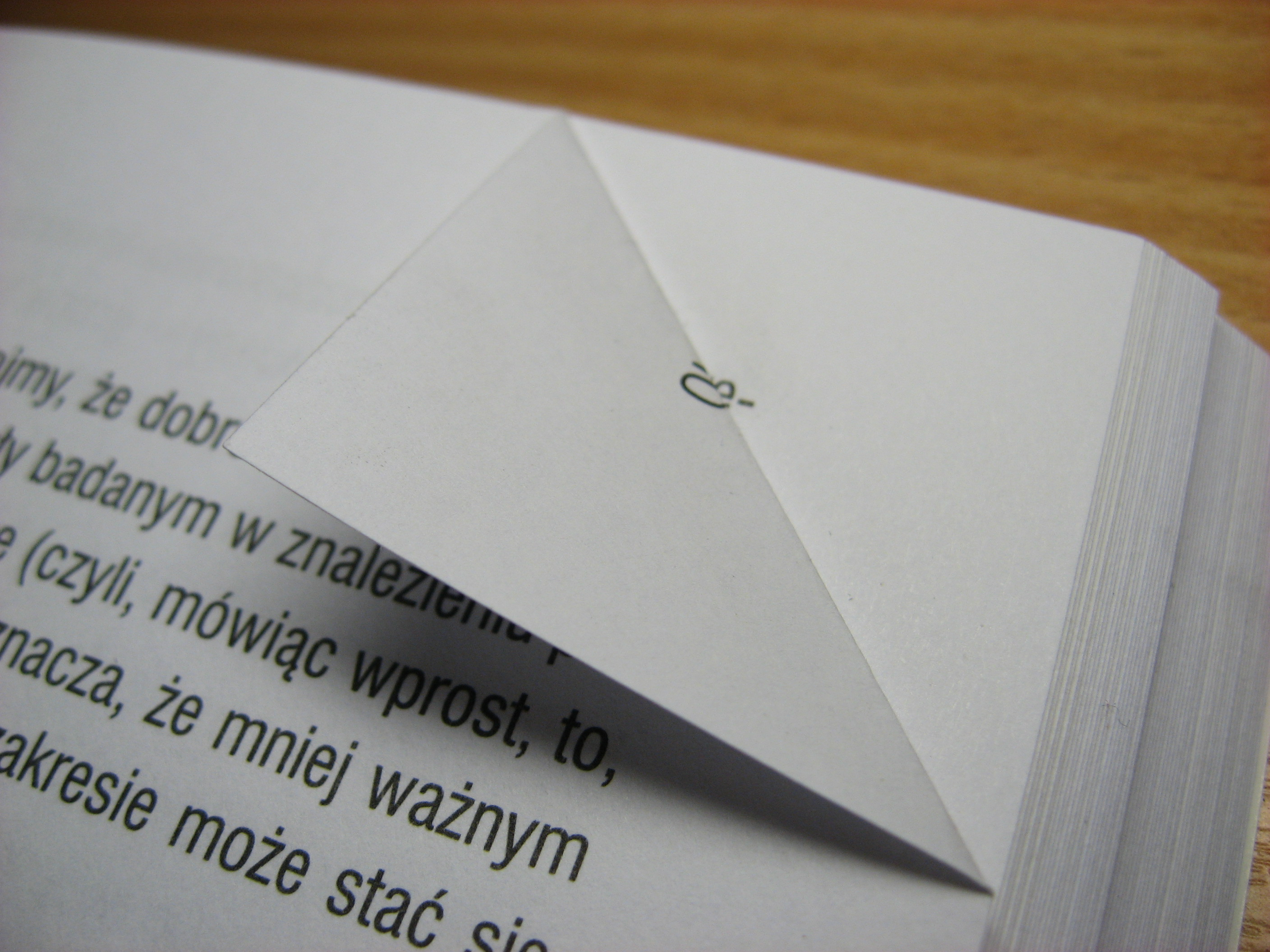
A dog-eared page

A dog ear is a folded down corner of a book page. The name refers to the ears of many breeds of domestic dog flapping over. A dog ear can serve as a bookmark, or be used to mark a section or phrase in a book that one finds to be important or of personal meaning. Other names for this practice include page folding and corner turning. The practice is generally frowned upon by those that want to preserve books in their original condition. It is also sometimes used to keep sheets of paper together, in the absence of a stapler or paper clip.

The phrase dates back at least to the 17th century (in the form "dog's ear"):

For one whole yeere thou must smooth out the dogs eares of all thy fellowes bookes.

— William Hawkins, Apollo Shroving, 1627, p. 93. (Quoted after the Oxford English Dictionary.)

There are some arguments in favor of dog ears. Some readers attest to the inconvenience of carrying around a bookmark or keeping them on hand; others describe the practice as evidence of attentive scholarship, deep reading, loving attention to a text.

Dog-ears may be unmade by folding them back into their original location and compressing the pages of the book together. Removing dog-ears is not recommended on paper that has yellowed from age, as it may cause the flap to separate from the page. Dog-earing more than one successive page can cause problems, as the flaps (depending on the thickness of the paper and the number of pages) may cause the marked sections to bulge and distort the book. Reference works are most prone to this problem.

== See also ==
- Manicule
