= Bookmark =

Marking tool

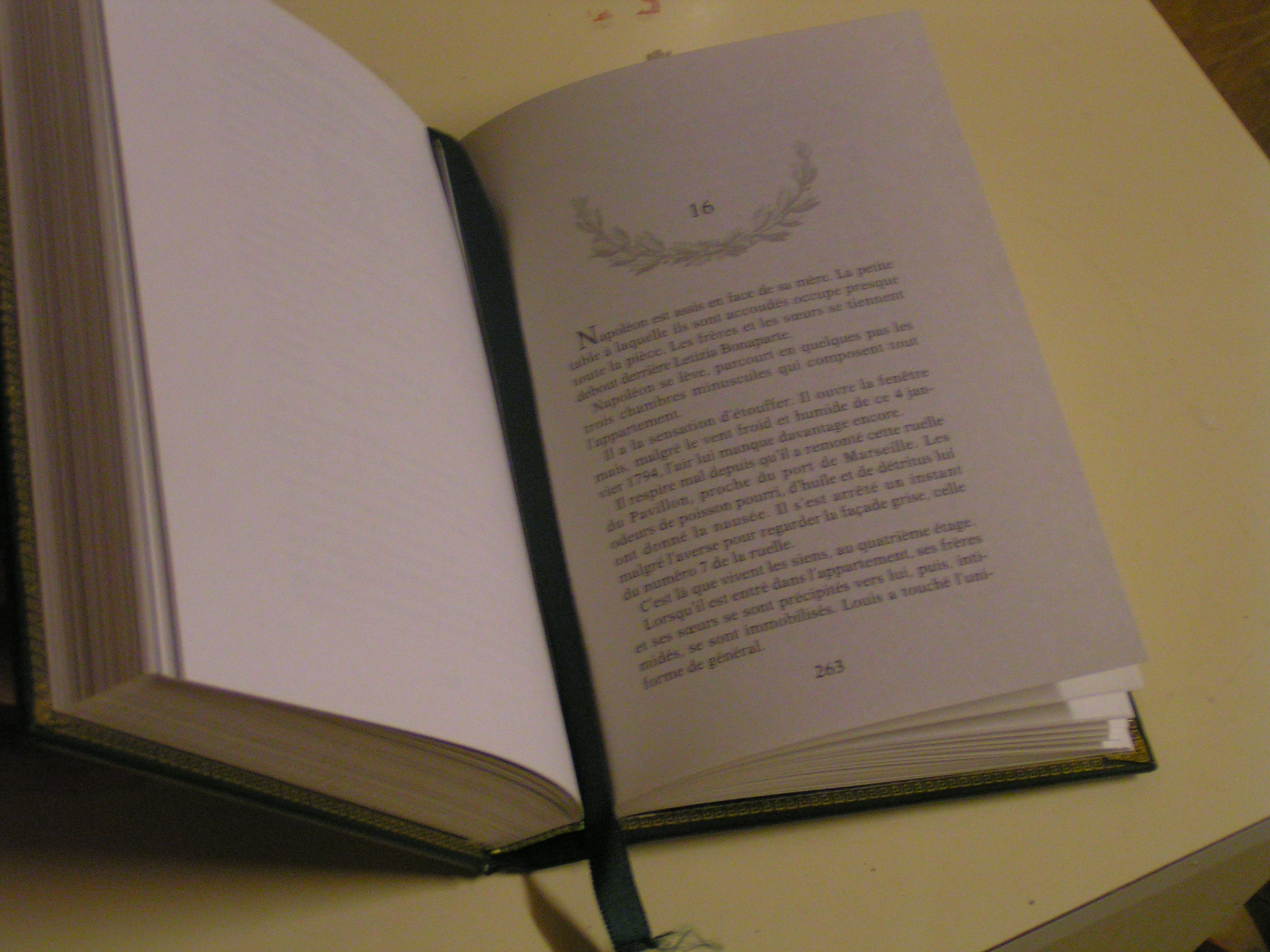
A book with a bound bookmark.

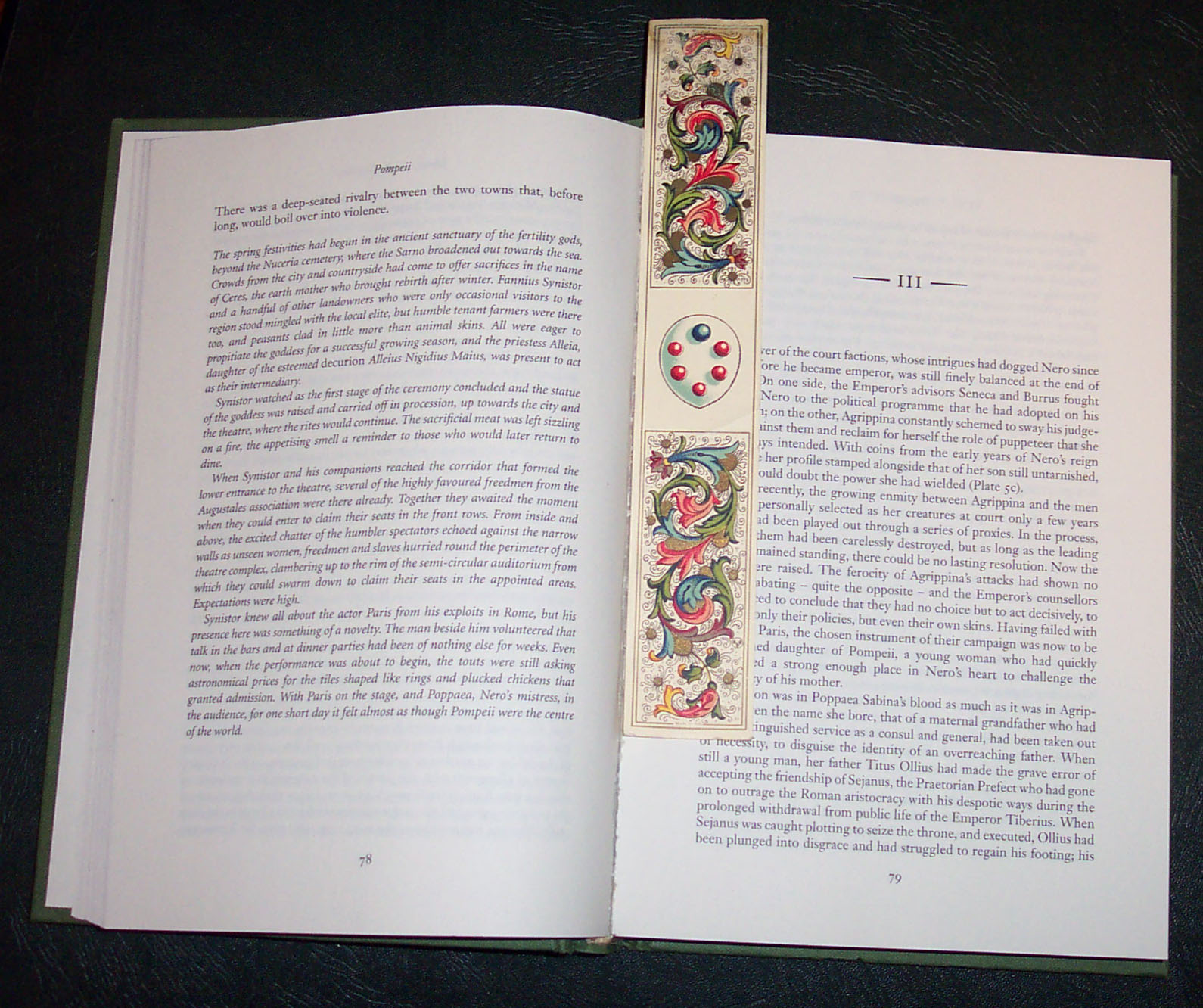
Book with florentine paper bookmark.

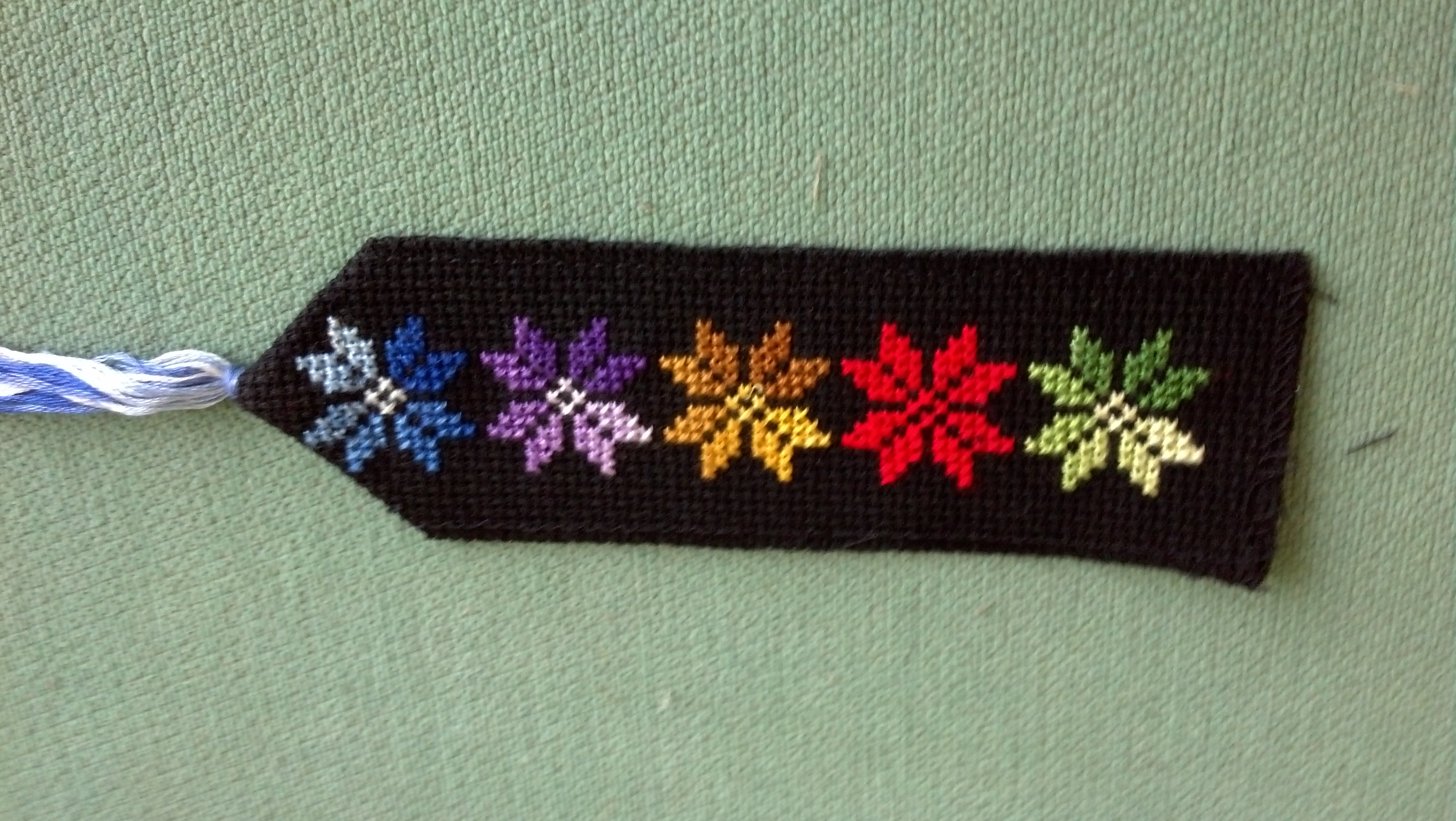
Fabric bookmark with Bedouin embroidery, Lakiya, Israel

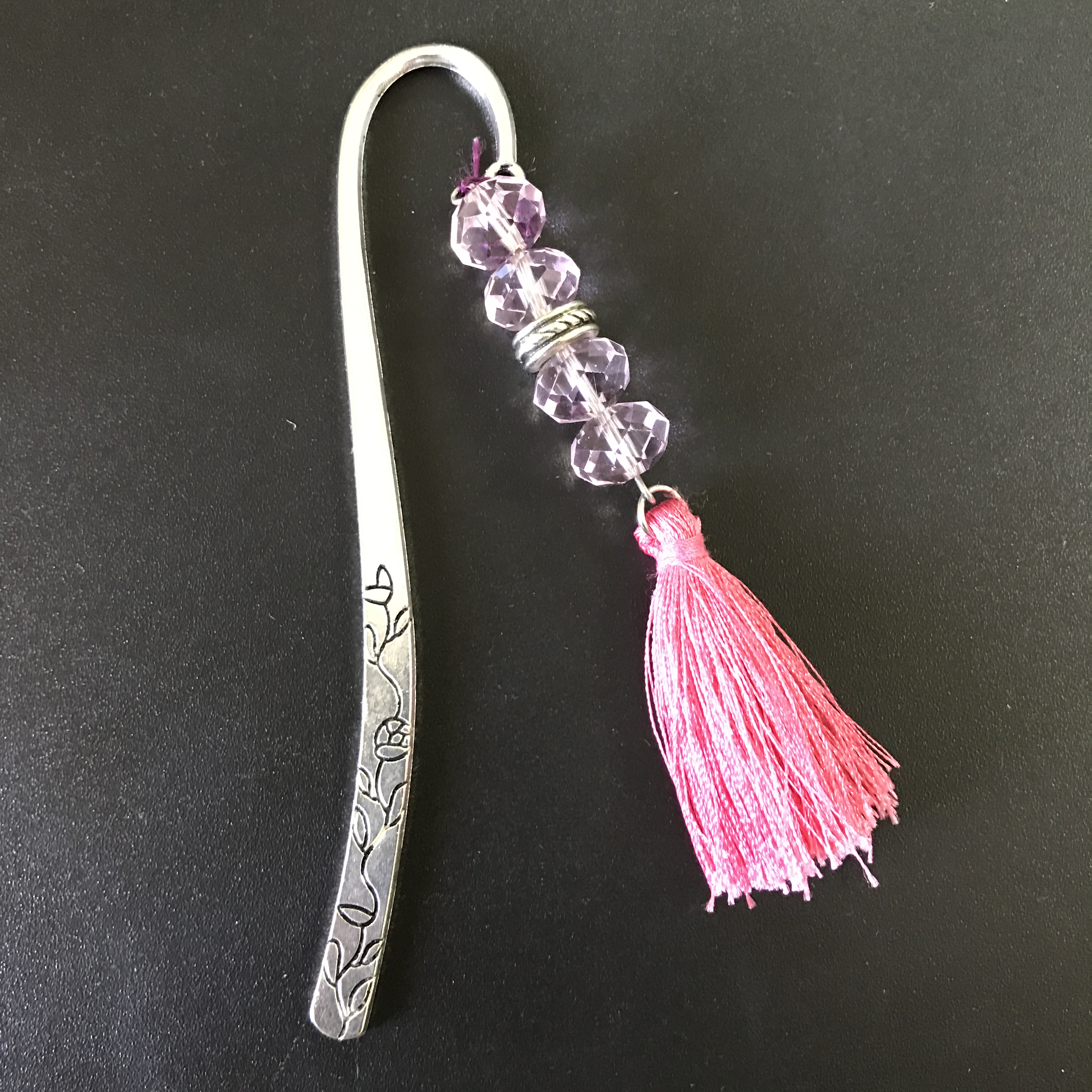
A metal bookmark with a fabric tassel and decorative beads

A bookmark is a thin marking tool, commonly made of card, leather, or fabric, used to keep track of a reader's progress in a book and allow the reader to easily return to where the previous reading session ended. Alternate materials for bookmarks are paper, metals like silver and brass, silk, wood, cord, and plastic. Some books may have one or more bookmarks made of woven ribbon sewn into the binding. Furthermore, other bookmarks incorporate a page-flap that enables them to be clipped on a page.

== History ==
According to new results of the research done on the history of bookmarks, there are indications that bookmarks have accompanied codices since their first emergence in the 1st century AD. The earliest existing bookmark dates from the 6th century AD and it is made of ornamented leather lined with vellum on the back and was attached with a leather strap to the cover of a Coptic codex (Codex A, MS 813 Chester Beatty Library, Dublin). It was found near Sakkara, Egypt, under the ruins of the monastery Apa Jeremiah. Further earliest bookmarks and remnants of them have been found in Coptic codices dating from the 1st to the 11th century and in Carolingian codices from the 8th to the 12th century. Bookmarks were used throughout the medieval period, consisting usually of a small parchment strip attached to the edge of folio (or a piece of cord attached to headband).

Modern bookmarks are available in a huge variety of materials in a multitude of designs and styles. Many are made of cardboard or heavy paper, but they are also constructed of paper, ribbon, fabric, felt, steel, wire, tin, beads, wood, plastic, vinyl, silver, gold, and other precious metals, some decorated with gemstones.

The first detached, and therefore collectible, bookmarkers began to appear in the 1850s. One of the first references to these is found in Mary Russell Mitford's Recollections of a Literary Life (1852): "I had no marker and the richly bound volume closed as if instinctively." Note the abbreviation of 'bookmarker' to 'marker'. The modern abbreviation is usually 'bookmark'. Historical bookmarks can be very valuable, and are sometimes collected along with other paper ephemera.

By the 1860s, attractive machine-woven markers were being manufactured, mainly in Coventry, England, the centre of the silk-ribbon industry. One of the earliest was produced by J.&J. Cash to mark the death of Albert, Prince Consort, in 1861. Thomas Stevens of Coventry soon became pre-eminent in the field and claimed to have nine hundred different designs.

Woven pictorial bookmarks produced by Thomas Steven, a 19th-century English silk weaver, starting around 1862, are called Stevengraphs. Woven silk bookmarks were very appreciated gifts in the Victorian Era and Stevens seemed to make one for every occasion and celebration. One Stevengraph read: All of the gifts which heaven bestows, there is one above all measure, and that's a friend midst all our woes, a friend is a found treasure to thee I give that sacred name, for thou art such to me, and ever proudly will I claim to be a friend to thee.

Most 19th-century bookmarks were intended for use in Bibles and prayer books and were made of ribbon, woven silk, or leather. By the 1880s the production of woven silk markers was declining and printed markers made of stiff paper or cardboard began to appear in significant numbers. This development paralleled the wider availability of books themselves, and the range of available bookmarkers soon expanded dramatically.

== Considerations for safe bookmark usage ==
Bookmarks that do not damage the books that they are used in should be acid-free; thin, so they will not indent the pages they rest between; and include no dyes or decorative materials that might bleed into the book's paper, with flat, thin, gentle edges.

== See also ==
- Bookmark (World Wide Web)
- Dog ears
- Rotating bookmark
