= Rotating bookmark =

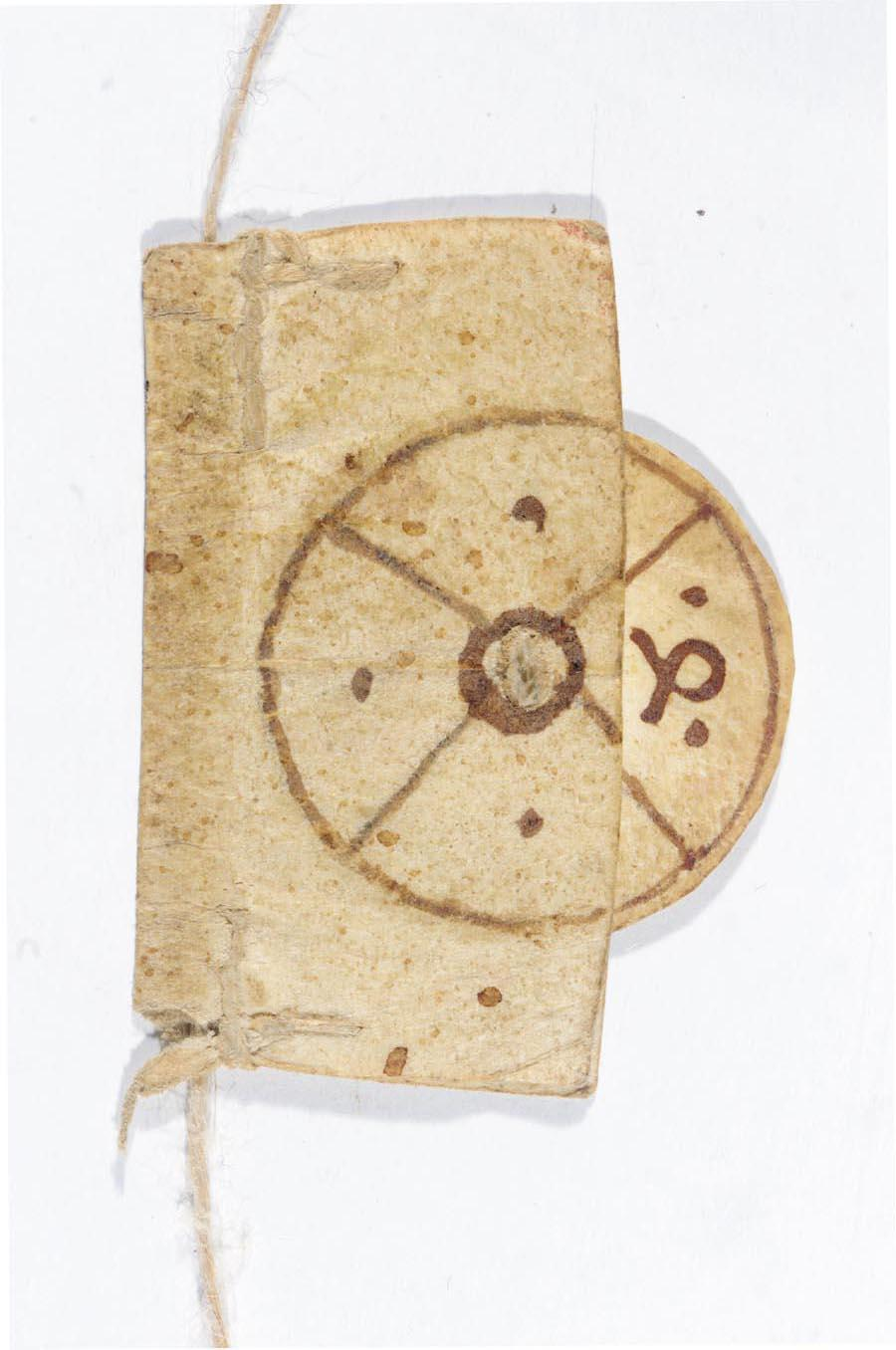
14th or early 15th century rotating bookmark from France.

Rotating bookmarks were a kind of bookmark used in medieval Europe. They were attached to a string, along which a marker could be slid up and down to mark a precise level on the page. Attached to the marker was a rotating disk that could indicate the column (usually numbered one to four, indicating the two columns on the left-hand page, and the two columns on the right-hand page).

About 30 such rotating bookmarks have been recorded in libraries in continental Europe, and another half a dozen in England.
