= Thomas Stevens (weaver) =

British weaver and innovator

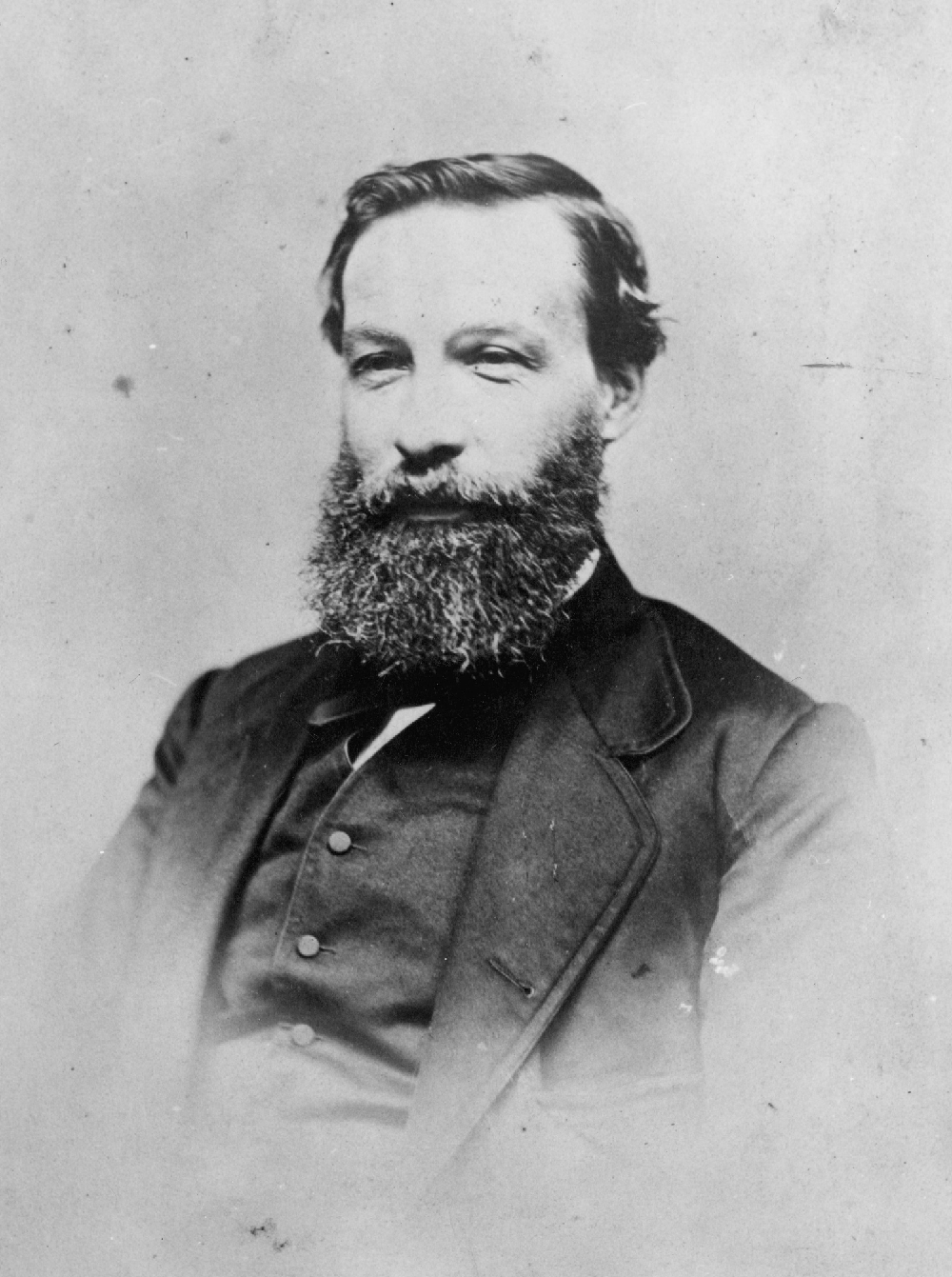
- Thomas Stevens in 1888
- Born: 1828; Foleshill, Warwickshire, England
- Died: 24 October 1888 (aged 59–60); London, England
- Resting place: London Road Cemetery, Coventry
- Occupation: Weaver
- Known for: Inventing the Stevengraph
- Children: 7, including Thomas Inger Stevens

Thomas Stevens (1828–1888) was a 19th-century weaver in Coventry, famous for his innovation of the stevengraph, a woven silk picture.

== Biography ==
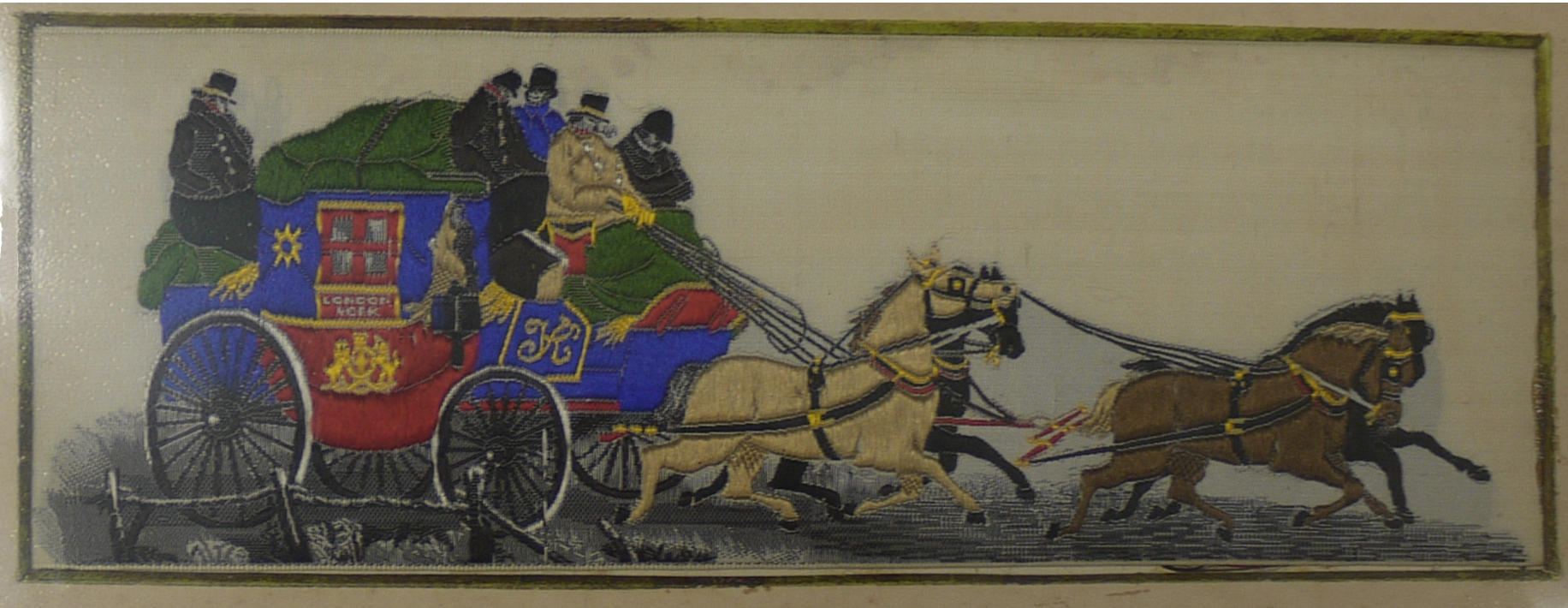
Stevengraph showing the London and York Royal Mail Coach, Herbert Art Gallery and Museum

In the 19th century the town of Coventry, England, was the centre of a ribbon weaving industry. Thomas Stevens was born in Foleshill, just to the north of Coventry, in 1828 to a relatively poor family. Stevens worked for Pears and Franklin, local ribbon weavers in Coventry, and by 1854 had created his own ribbon firm. In 1860, however, the Cobden–Chevalier Treaty was signed; this free trade treaty introduced new competition into the industry, leading to a collapse in the local ribbon economy and a huge loss of employment in Coventry.

Stevens had considerable experience of experimenting with the Jacquard loom and responded to the local recession by trying to develop new products. He had invented a way of using the programmable loom to weave colourful pictures from silk. By 1862, Stevens could produce four different designs. He attempted to appeal to the mass market, selling his products between six pence and fifteen shillings each in order to stimulate a demand that would keep his workers in employment. Some of these pictures were used for bookmarks, greetings cards and specialised products for the Admiralty.

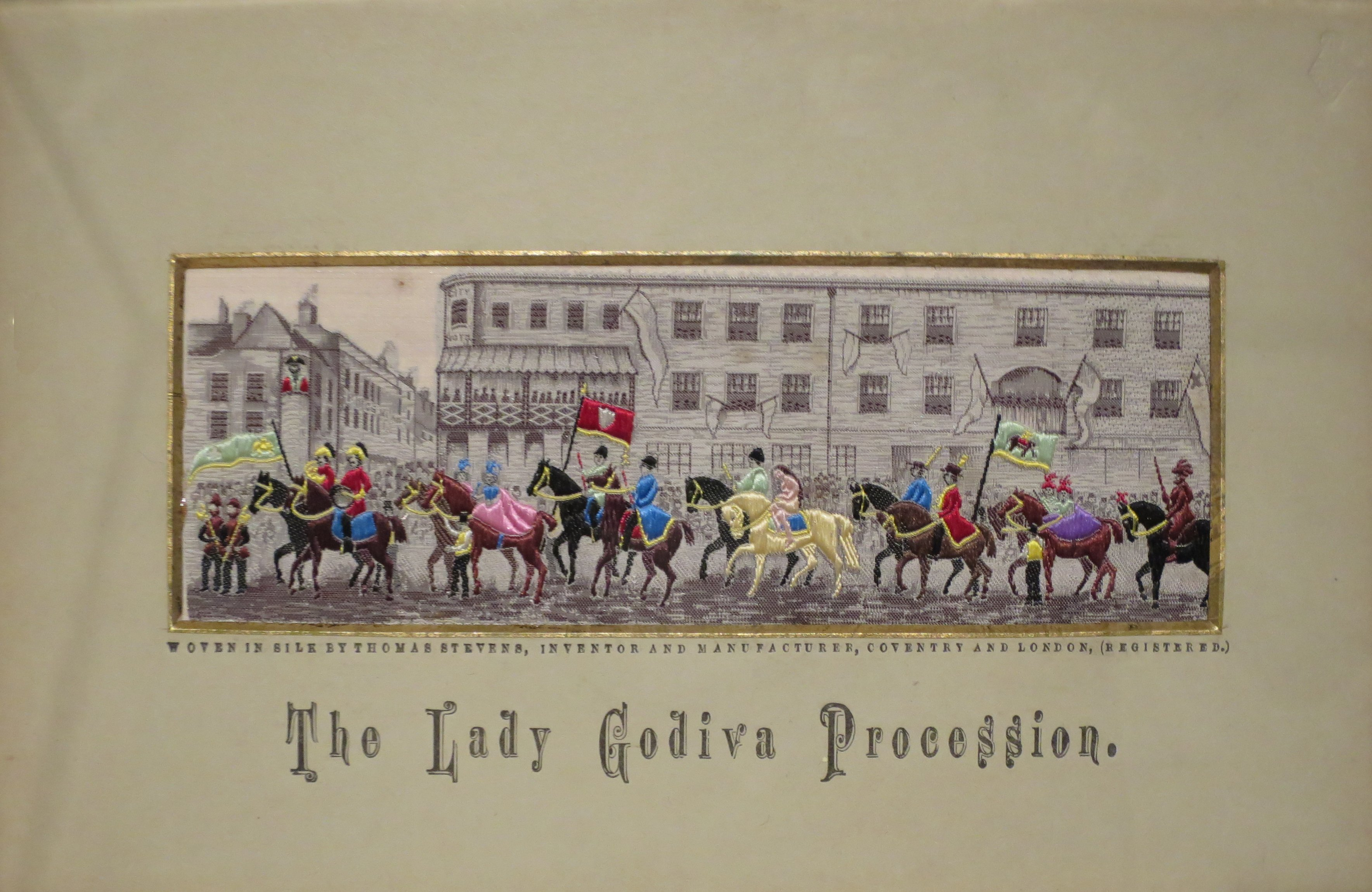
The Lady Godiva Procession, Honolulu Museum of Art

Business boomed and Stevens acquired two larger factories in turn; by 1875 he was calling his product the "Stevengraph", named after himself. He exhibited internationally in America, France and Holland, winning some 30 medals and diplomas. In 1878 Stevens moved to London and began to mount his Stevengraphs as framed pictures - by the late 1880s Stevens had over 900 different designs, including portraits, local scenes, British and foreign royalty, famous buildings, historical events, classical subjects, sports scenes, nursery rhymes and locomotion.

In 1888 Stevens died following a throat operation in London, and was buried in London Road Cemetery, Coventry.

== Legacy ==
By the 1930s, Stevengraphs were considered collectable items, but the hobby was considered eccentric and mainly confined to female collectors. During the Second World War Coventry was attacked by German bombers; on 14 November 1940 the Coventry Blitz occurred, destroying the Stevens factory and the records of the Stevengraphs. In the late 1950s it emerged that Henry Stephens, a relative of Thomas, had saved one of the pattern books the night before the attack and kept it in safe storage. He later donated it to the Coventry City Council, who in turn entrusted it with the Herbert Art Gallery and Museum. Stevengraphs became valuable, with more male collectors entering the hobby. Prices rose, particularly for unusual or rarer images less popular during the Victorian period.

A large collection of Stevens' work and his pattern book is still held at the Herbert Art Gallery and Museum, with Stevengraphs also held in collections at the Bodleian Library, the Science Museum, the Victoria and Albert Museum and the National Trust property Greenway House, near Brixham, Devon.

== Bibliography ==
- Lynes, Alice. (n.d.) Thomas Stevens And His Silk Ribbon Pictures. Local History Pamphlet No.2. Coventry: Coventry City Libraries.
- Wollen, Peter. (2004) Paris/Manhattan: Writings on Art. London: Verso. ISBN 978-1-85984-580-6.
