= Charles Goodall & Sons =

British playing card marker

Charles Goodall
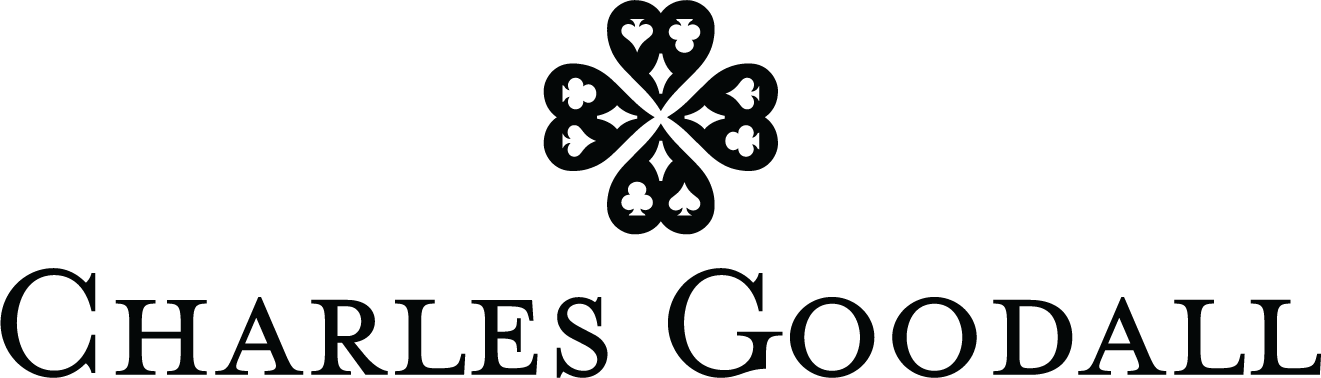
- Formerly: Charles Goodall & Sons, Goodall
- Industry: Printing
- Founded: 1820, Soho
- Founder: Charles Goodall
- Fate: Acquired by Alcarum
- Headquarters: London, England
- Area served: United Kingdom, Europe, North America, India, Australia
- Products: Playing cards for poker, patience, bridge, and other games.
- Owner: Alcarum

Charles Goodall (also referred to as Charles Goodall & Sons or just Goodall) was a British playing card maker based in London; first at Soho and later in Camden. Goodall, alongside primary domestic competitor De La Rue, accounted for approximately two-thirds of domestic playing card production by 1850. The firm's Camden works employed in excess of one-thousand people, and consequently played a key role in the economic development of East London. During the firm's pinnacle it obtained medals at ten different international exhibitions.

Goodall has maintained an enduring impact on playing card design, with the family pioneering double-headed court cards that are now the standard. Prior to this design development face cards had featured a more traditional portrait, and were thus illegible if held upside down by a player.

== Origins: 1820–1850 ==
Charles Goodall was born to a working-class family in Northampton in 1785, during the reign of King George III. As a child, his family relocated from the East Midlands to London. Subsequently, in 1801 at the age of sixteen Goodall joined John William Hunt's firm Hunt & Sons which had been in operation since 1790. In this role as a card maker, he was consequently inducted into the Worshipful Company of Makers of Playing Cards as an apprentice. Following nineteen years with Hunt, Goodall decided to act upon his ambition and established his own facilities in London's Soho district in 1820. Initially producing a combination of playing cards and ornate message cards, Goodall's cards distinctly resembled those he had learnt to produce under Hunt.

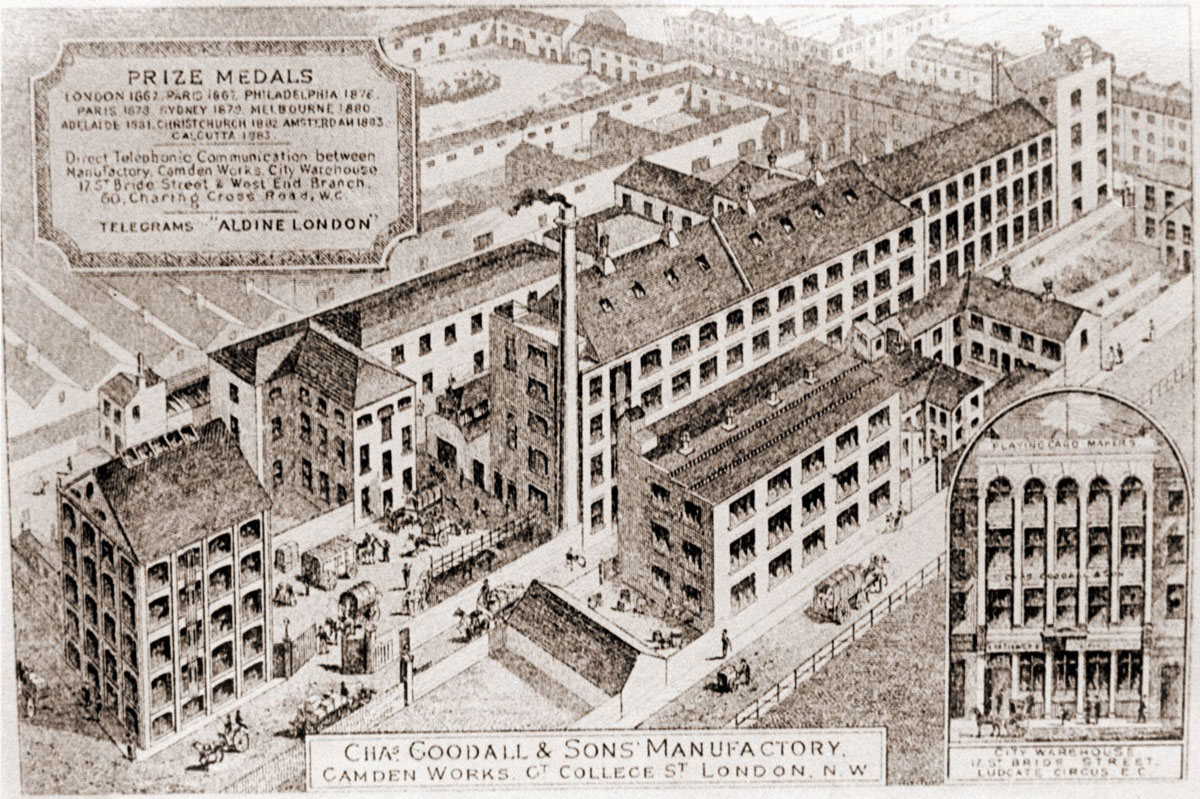
Charles Goodall & Sons Camden works factory prior to the fire.

These products quickly found demand in the London market, amplified by the increasing popularity of card games, Goodall increased its premise sizes in 1826 and again in 1830 when relocating to substantially larger premises at Great College Street, Camden. The facility had initially been used as a firearms manufacturer, and later for steam engines, but was promptly renovated for use in playing card production with requisite equipment. It was at this time that he began to experiment with modernised playing card faces, particularly in relation to the court cards; a decision that would serve to meaningfully shape the standardisation of faces we know today. The company flourished through the latter 1830s, as the popularity of Goodall's contemporary designs grew, and without the manufacturer's reputation. Charles' two sons joined the company during this time to share the managerial load associated with the rapidly expanding business.

On October 15, 1845, tragedy struck the core of the business when Goodall's factory in Camden erupted in flames. Reports at the time stated: "Shortly after nine o'clock a call was received from the establishment of Charles Goodall and Sons, playing, message, and other cards manufacturer, Camden Town, by which the boards over the flue were destroyed, and the stock slightly damaged by fire and water." Such a loss of inventory and equipment constituted a turning point, and the decision was made for the brand to forge ahead with the full introduction of modernised court cards. The most notable alterations to these cards were the prominent red, blue, and yellow colouring that persists today, as well as the introduction of decorated card backs. By 1850, Goodall and primary competitor Thomas De La Rue were, between the two of them, producing in excess of two-thirds of all playing cards made in England.

== Product Expansion: 1851–1880 ==
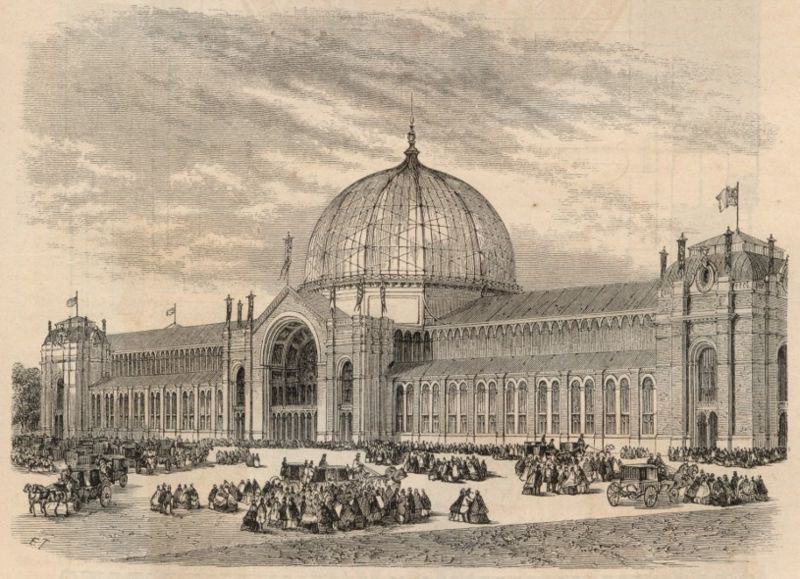
View of the 1862 International Exhibition Hall in South Kensington, London where Goodall received its first medal.

Demand continued to far outweigh supply, and additional premises were secured nearby the Camden Works to ensure burgeoning market could be fulfilled. In 1862, such growth was accelerated when the Crown elected to reduce the tax on playing cards from one shilling to three pence. Such a price reduction catalysed a threefold increase in demand over the subsequent years, with Goodall's production eclipsing two million packs. It was at this time that the firm received its first international prize when the brand received a medal at 1862 Great London Exposition hosted in South Kensington. This was shortly followed by yet more prize medals at the 1867 Paris Exposition Universelle.

In 1862, Goodall pioneered a phenomenon that persists to this day, with the introduction of commercially printed Christmas cards. The firm sought to leverage this popularity with the introduction of premium stationery and games in 1868, however, it was the brand's playing cards that continued to receive much endorsement. During the latter 1860s, Goodall pioneered the widespread introduction of double-headed cards, a move away from the classic design which featured a more traditional portrait on court cards. In an effort to emphasise the quality of the brand's offering, and the firm's positioning as a premiere producer, gold edging was incorporated into premium packs.

By the turn of the decade, Goodall had established itself alongside De La Rue and Reynolds as preeminent card manufacturers in the British market. It is during this time that evidence of Goodall's participation in foreign markets, namely the United States of America and India became apparent. To cope with the expansion of their core market, the firm opened a city warehouse located at 17 Saint Bride Street, Ludgate Circus.

Alongside this expansion, new presses were purchased in 1879 to enable the production of ornate calendars and multicoloured greeting cards, alongside the development of chromolithography. The development of ornate stationery received near instantaneous acclaim when the firm received two gold and one silver medal at the Paris Exposition Universelle of 1878, a record tally for the business.

== Pre-War Competition: 1881–1913 ==
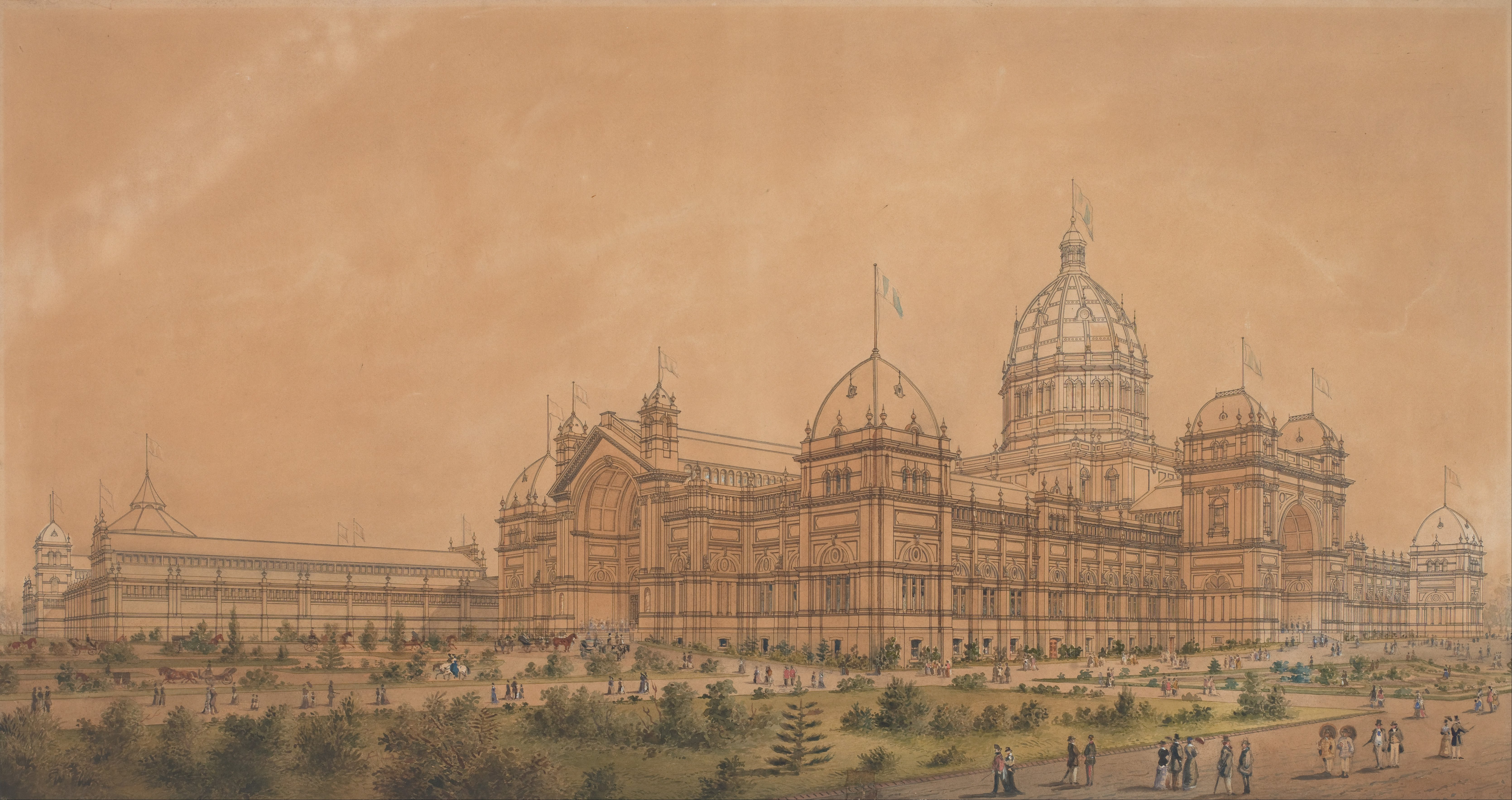
The 1880 Melbourne Exhibition Hall where Goodall's wares received numerous accolades.

Between 1880 and 1885 Reynolds was acquired, a competitor who had preceded Goodall by eleven years having been founded at 27–30 Verve Street, London in 1809. Reynolds had in the years preceding the transaction struggled to transition from the traditional woodblock method to that of the printing press. Goodall's propensity to shape industry trends and norms was entrenched when Josiah M. Goodall, Charles' heir, was invited to participate in the London Chamber of Commerce as a representative of the trades associated with inks, paper, and printing. Josiah was appointed to a sub-committee that was to represent the whole section of the trade affiliated with playing and greeting card production. Goodall's influence in the sphere was largely driven by the firm employing nearly five hundred staff by 1881. During this time, Goodall continued to receive acclaim, including much fanfare upon introduction to the Australian market. This reception was reflected in the firm's receipt of four first-class awards at the Sydney Exhibition of 1879, shortly followed by four silver medals at the Melbourne Exhibition of 1880. Such acclaim was succeeded by commendations in Adelaide 1881, Christchurch 1882, and Amsterdam 1883.

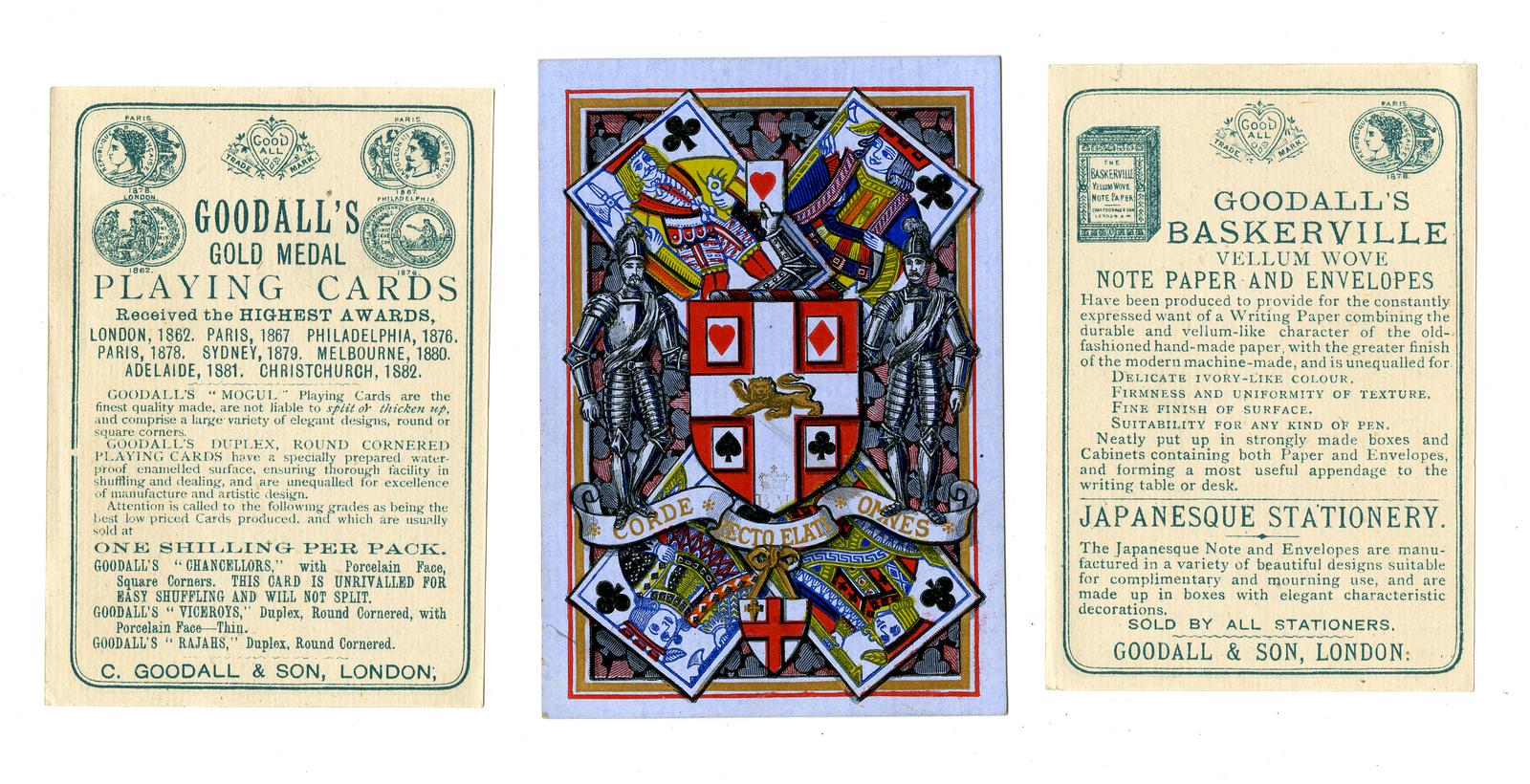
1883 deck of Charles Goodall & Sons playing cards produced for the Worshipful Company of Makers of Playing Cards.

Goodall's impressive 1883 catalogue encompassed nearly five hundred distinct designs, with commentators noting that all were; "in the best taste, and executed in the most high-class style". The cards' prominent features of two headed court cards, numbered corners, and distinctive pips made them a favourite for their ease of use in game. Trade coverage of the 1883 catalogue surmised the range offered by Goodall as; "Ascending in the scale, both in quality of materials and lavishness of decoration, are 'Harlequins', 'Andrews', 'Columbines', 'Highlanders', 'Harrys' ... other varieties included 'Statesmen', 'Consuls', and 'Presidents' ... Some of the specimens, in fact, take such high rank as art productions that it seems sacrilege to finger them at the card table".

1885 saw Goodall work to cement its position as a market incumbent following the acquisition of Reynolds in the preceding years. The firm did so in two distinct manners; firstly, it launched The London Playing Card Company as a low price alternative to Goodall's premium offering in an effort to dissuade new entrants from entering the lucrative London market. Second, in 1887, Goodall entered into a contract with Victor Mauger to import Goodall branded cards into New York, as well as produce Mauger branded cards in their Camden works for retail in North America.

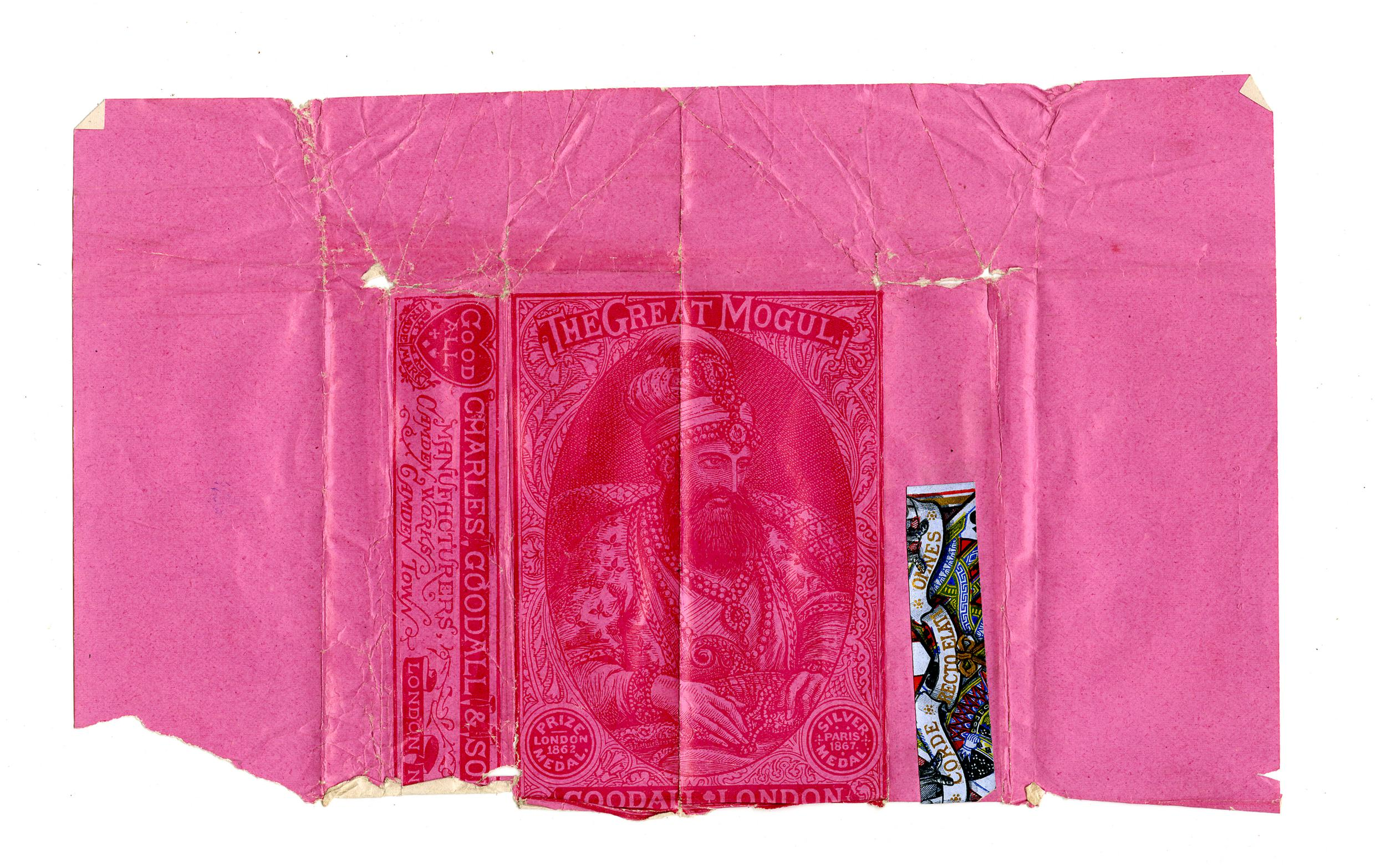
Original wrapper from a Charles Goodall deck held by the British Museum's archives.

Such publicity did however, come with certain expenses, especially those of a peculiar nature. In March 1888 Ralph Cooper was charged with forging a cheque for £3,670, a sum in excess of half a million pounds in today's terms, in the name of Goodall. It was revealed in court that Goodall maintained a sizeable account with the London and Westminster Bank, today NatWest, and the business regularly drew large cheques from the bank's Bloomsburg branch. It was found that, knowing this to be common practice, Cooper sought to pass off a cheque bearing the signature of a Goodall representative. Cooper was later arrested in France, having fled with the cash, with his trial garnering significant public fascination. Whilst such an incident was far more memorable in the minds' of the broader British public, Goodall maintained a crucial affinity with the local community dependent upon its Camden works which employed approximately one-thousand tradespeople. Evidence of such was documented in December 1888, when Adam Armstrong, Goodall's foreman carpenter of six years retired, upon which occasion the company held a celebration at the Golden Lion, Great College Street, with members of the Goodall family attending the farewell. Whilst the company may have remained jovial, the end of the century signalled a significant change in the British playing card market as lower priced, overseas manufactured alternatives became increasingly popular. This increasingly competitive environment warranted a marketing drive that sought to reiterate Goodall's status as the quality leader in the local market. Sensing a renewed need for innovation in the playing card industry, Goodall introduced linen grained cards in 1906, under the 'Linette' product name.

Commentary at the time of release praised these "linen grained playing cards", for their pleasant feel and ease of dealing, a substantial improvement in durability and tactility compared to historic paper or card based incumbents. These Linette cards quickly became popular, and soon featured gilt edges to further differentiate them. Goodall's innovation had reinvigorated the business, and soon orders continued to flow from Commonwealth nations such as India, Canada, and Australia, with local merchants labelling Charles Goodall and Sons "the famous English card house". This period of success for the firm was however marred by personal difficulty, when Alexander Bower, a foreman at the Goodall Camden works for in excess of fifty years, died, dealing a substantial blow to morale. Despite this, the community driven nature of the Goodall works, largely due to its socioeconomic importance in the area, remained apparent when the Charles Goodall and Sons team carried off the first place cup for the Printing and Stationery Trades Cricket Association in a postseason concert arranged by the City of London.

== Post-War Consolidation: 1914–1933 ==
Shortly after Europe would find itself plunged into the Great War, and many of the young men who in years previous had played on such a cricket team or found work in the Camden premises were tragically lost. In the economic downturn during, and immediately following the Great War, the playing card industry increasingly struggled. In 1921, the notion was floated for industry consolidation to take place in order to enable British firms to better protect the local market. By November of that year, the British, Foreign and Colonial Corporation announced it would be facilitating the public issuance of shares in Thomas De La Rue Limited. By this time, De La Rue had diversified from playing cards into the production of bank notes and postage stamps for nearly the entirety of the British Empire. The rationale was that economies of scale generated by combining print oriented businesses would facilitate accelerated growth for all parties. As such, De La Rue sought to raise £800,000 to finance the acquisition of Goodall, and established Scottish paper-makers J.A. Weir. In total, De La Rue was able to gain access to £2,000,000 as investor sentiment buoyed post-war, a more than ample amount to make the aforementioned acquisitions and facilitate their integration. By May of the following year the deal had been concluded, and Charles Goodall ceased to be an independent, family-owned entity. After more than a century of independent operations, the Goodall brand as an independent operation ceased to exist.

Whilst all share capital was acquired, Goodall initially maintained a degree of discretion in remaining solely focussed upon the playing card sector. Packs at the time maintained their Goodall branding, but now prominently featured the name of the controlling entity beneath it. The Camden works were kept open until 1929, however, an increasing need for consolidation under the Great Depression prompted their closure and abandonment. For De La Rue, their woes deepened, having paid £203,058 in cash for Goodall's equity just nine years prior, by 1931 the company was in a dire financial position. Whilst De La Rue survived this tumultuous period of the Great Depression, the Goodall brand did not, and was a casualty of the recurrent restructurings its new parent company undertook.

In 2022, the brand rights were acquired by Alcarum.
