= Greeting card =

Piece of card with a picture and a message

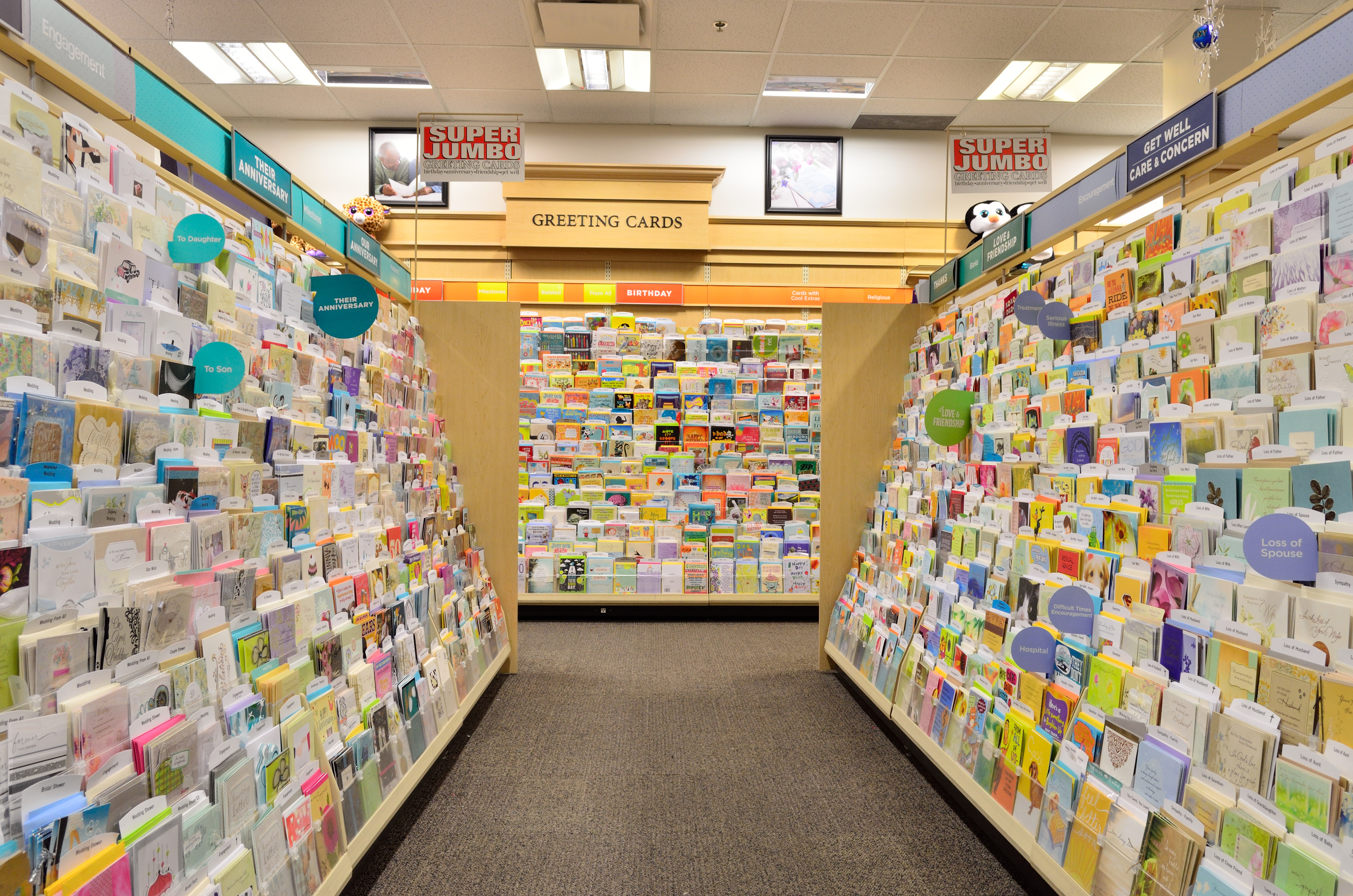
Greeting cards on display at retail

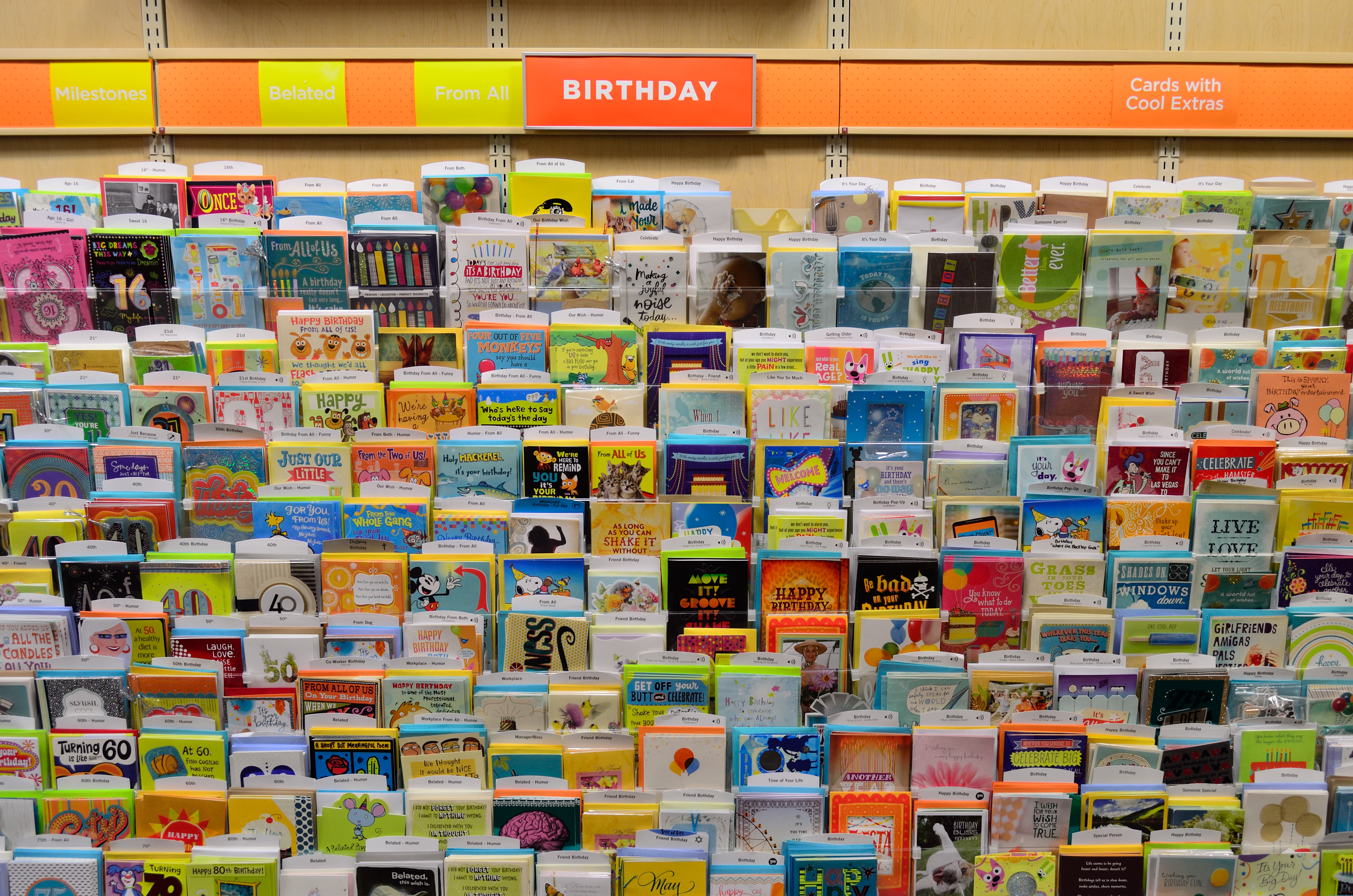
Birthday cards up close

A greeting card (American English) or greetings card (British English) is a piece of card stock, usually with an illustration or photo on its front cover, made of high-quality paper featuring an expression of friendship, love, celebration, or other sentiment. Greeting cards are traditionally given on special occasions such as birthdays, weddings, anniversaries, baby showers, baptisms, and graduations, or during the holidays, including New Year's Day, Valentine's Day, Easter, Halloween, Thanksgiving, and Christmas. Greeting cards can also be sent to express other feelings, such as giving thanks, sympathy, encouragement, or best wishes to get well from an illness or injury.

Greeting cards are usually packaged using an envelope and come in a variety of styles. There are both mass-produced and handmade versions available and they may be distributed by hundreds of companies large and small. While typically inexpensive, more elaborate cards with die-cuts, pop-ups, sound elements or glued-on decorations may be more expensive.

Hallmark Cards and American Greetings, both U.S.-based companies, are the two most commercially successful producers of greeting cards in the world today.

In Western countries and increasingly in other societies, many people traditionally mail seasonally themed cards to their friends and relatives during holiday seasons, especially in December. Many service businesses also send cards to their customers in this season, typically with a universally acceptable non-religious message such as "happy holidays" or "season's greetings." Many people also usually include money or gift cards that are placed into greeting cards.

== Types ==
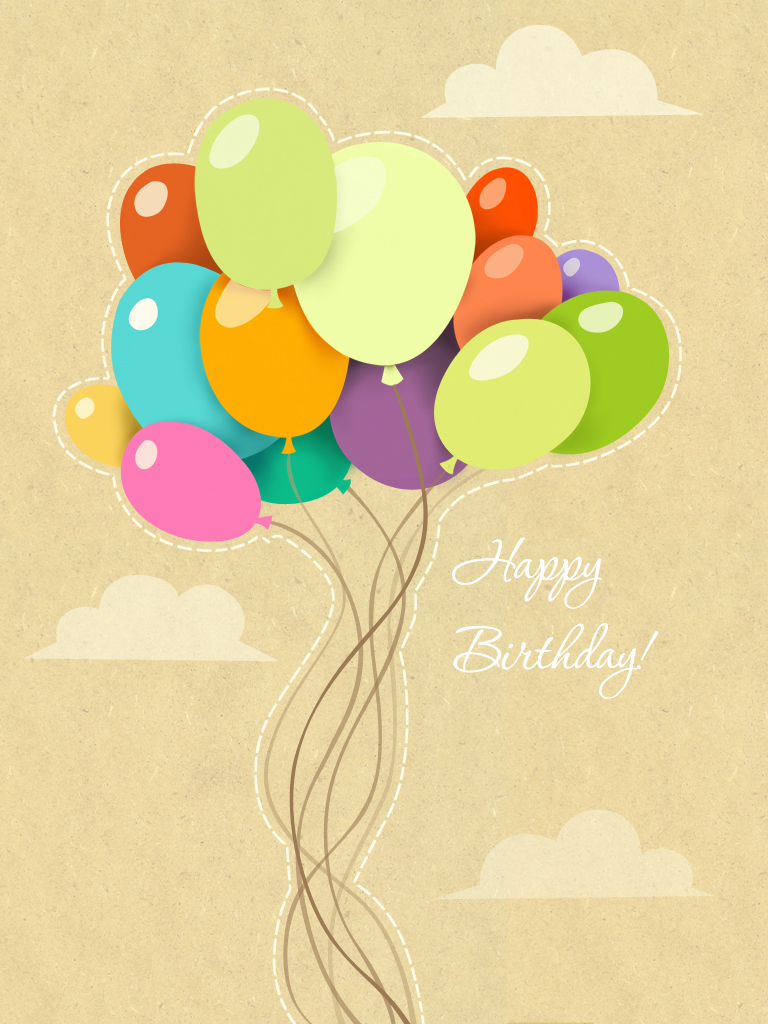
Greeting card (example)

=== Counter cards ===
Greeting cards that are sold individually. This contrasts with boxed cards.

=== Standard ===
A standard greeting card is printed on high-quality paper (such as card stock), and is rectangular and folded, with a picture or decorative motif on the front. Inside is a pre-printed message appropriate for the occasion, along with a blank space for the sender to add a signature or handwritten message. A matching envelope is sold with the card. Some cards and envelopes feature fancy materials, such as gold leaf, ribbons, or glitter.

=== Handmade ===
A handmade card is a card which includes a production stage or a feature that is made by hand. The term covers a wide range of products including not only for example, applique items or ribbons but also pop-up and 3-D cards as well as cards made with mixed materials. The term "Handmade" is applied both to cards made by amateurs and to volume-production cards that include stages made by hand.

=== Photo ===
A photo card is a card which features a photograph chosen by the sender. There are two main types of photo card. The first is the photo insert card which is designed to display a sender's own photo. Depending on the card design, the photo is stuck to the card, clipped to the card or slid into a pocket in the card into which a hole has been cut to act as a frame. The second type is the printed photo card, in which the photo is combined with artwork and printed directly onto the face of the card. Both types are popular for sending holiday greetings such as Christmas, Hanukkah, and for baby showers, where the sender wishes to send a memento of their own family. See also Personalised cards.

=== Personalised ===
A personalised card is one that features the sender's own pictures or a personal audible message. Websites using special print-personalisation technology, such as Moonpig, allow consumers to personalise a card which is then printed and sent directly to the recipient. Sound personalization is also possible using a small recording device called a Botski, which is a sticker-based recordable medium allowing users to record songs, sounds or spoken words and include them in a greeting card.

=== Reusable ===
These are greeting cards for the budget conscious. There are two common formats for reusable cards. Firstly, there are cards with slits in them positioned to hold pages. Secondly, there are notepad style cards where pages stick to the back of the cards. The pages that have been used for reusable cards can be removed after being received and fresh pages can be used to reuse the cards.

=== Sound-based or musical ===
Some greeting cards play music or other sound when they are opened. They are commonly 3D handmade cards which play traditional celebration songs such as "Happy Birthday To You.” They also may be personalized using a Botski which is a small, sticker-based recordable medium which users can record their own music, sounds or voice greeting and apply it to a card.

=== Electronic ===
(also called e-cards) Greeting cards can also be sent electronically. Flash-based cards can be sent by email, and many sites such as Facebook enable users to send greetings. More recently, companies such as 2050cards have started providing ecards as downloadable videos that can be sent mobile-to-mobile via instant messaging platforms such as WhatsApp and Facebook.

=== Quilling cards ===
Quilling cards are greeting cards that contain a Quilled design on the front of the card. Quilling is an artform where strips of paper are rolled to make intricate designs. These cards are unique and handcrafted and are often framed as works of art.

=== Pop-up ===
Pop-up cards are normally cards that, once opened, have a picture coming outward, giving the reader a surprise. Pictures and printed messages in greeting cards come in various styles, from fine art to humorous to profane. Non-specific cards, unrelated to any occasion, might feature a picture (or a pocket to paste in a personal photograph) but no pre-printed message. Paper Pop Cards has a patent for detachable pop-up cards which lets the pop-up be saved as a keepsake. Pop-up card designs are inspired by the Kirigami art form, which originated in Japan. This card style has spread to the US, U.K., India and elsewhere. In Shark Tank episode 605 in season 11, the startup Lovepop cards founded by Wombi Rose and John Wise appeared with Kirigami art inspired pop up cards and raised $300,000 of funding.

=== Printable ===
Also known as digital greeting cards, they can be found online through shopping platforms such as Etsy and some blogs. Usually available in the form of a PDF document, the design for a card can be printed out at home or a local print shop. Printable cards have allowed designers to make cards readily available to customers all over the world.

=== Fabric ===
The concept of a khaki fabric card appeared in 1899 during the first Christmas of the Boer War and was issued by a business in Glasgow. In New Zealand, it was not uncommon to receive a khaki greeting card, even the premier, RJ Seddon is said to have received one. An example of a fabric card is held by the Auckland War Memorial Museum, and is a small square of fabric with a heavy fringe created by threads with a hand written greeting.

== History ==
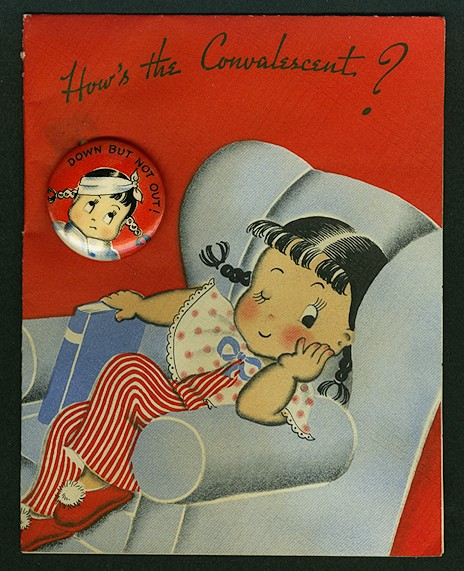
A get well card from 1949

The custom of sending greeting cards can be traced back to the ancient Chinese who exchanged messages of good will to celebrate the New Year, and to the early Egyptians, who conveyed their greetings on papyrus scrolls. By the early 15th century, handmade paper greeting cards were being exchanged in Europe. The Germans are known to have printed New Year's greetings from woodcuts as early as 1400, and handmade paper Valentines were being exchanged in various parts of Europe in the early to mid-15th century, with the oldest Valentine in existence being in the British Museum. The card was written to Bonne of Armagnac by her husband, Charles, Duke of Orléans, who was imprisoned in the Tower of London at the time. Not surprisingly, its message is rather downbeat. Its opening reads: ‘I am already sick of love / my very gentle Valentine.’

By the 1850s, the greeting card had been transformed from a relatively expensive, handmade and hand-delivered gift to a popular and affordable means of personal communication, due largely to advances in printing, mechanization, and a reduction in postal rates with the introduction of the postage stamp. This was followed by new trends like Christmas cards, the first of which appeared in published form in London in 1843 when Sir Henry Cole hired artist John Calcott Horsley to design a holiday card that he could send to his friends and acquaintances. In the 1860s, inventor Hugh Pierce Jr., inspired by the Christmas card, invented the Birthday card. Companies like Marcus Ward & Co, Charles Goodall & Son, and Charles Bennett began the mass production of greeting cards. They employed well-known artists such as Kate Greenaway and Walter Crane as illustrators and card designers. The extensive Laura Seddon Greeting Card Collection from the Manchester Metropolitan University gathers 32,000 Victorian and Edwardian greeting cards and 450 Valentine's Day cards dating from the early nineteenth century, printed by the major publishers of the day.

Technical developments like color lithography in 1930 propelled the manufactured greeting card industry forward. Humorous greeting cards, known as studio cards, became popular in the late 1940s and 1950s. A 1958 article about the U.S. greeting card business cites the trade’s reference to its contemporary, postwar offerings as “Modern Cards,” as opposed to “Traditional Cards,” noting that the preceding decade’s U.S. sales had grown from three to four-and-a-half billion cards yearly: “The Modern Card has not won over old customers, so much as it has brought into card shops millions of Americans who had never bought a greeting card before.”

In the 1970s, Recycled Paper Greetings, a small company needing to establish a competing identity against the large companies like Hallmark Cards, began publishing humorous, whimsical card designs with the artist's name credited on the back. This was away from what was known as the standard look (sometimes called the Hallmark look.)

During the 1980s, reduced costs of small batch printing and die cutting together with a growing taste for handmade cards made it economically possible for smaller niche companies to set up in competition with the large established brands. Innovative companies such as Nobleworks and Meri Meri grew from their foundation in the 1980s to becoming significant influencers in the industry. A thriving market was established for what were now called "alternative" greeting cards. The name stuck even though these "alternative" cards grew to embrace a vast range of styles and ultimately changed the look of the industry.

The largest recorded number of greeting cards sent to a single person went to Craig Shergold, a beneficiary/victim of chain letters and later chain emails.

== Economic effects ==
In the United Kingdom, an estimated one billion pounds are spent on greeting cards every year, with the average person sending 55 cards annually. In the United States, approximately 6.5 billion greeting cards are bought each year, at a total cost of more than US$7 billion.

A counter card in the U.S. typically sells for $2 to $4. Boxed cards, which are a popular option for Christmas cards or other times when multiple cards are sent, tend to cost less.

== Greeting Card Association ==
The Greeting Card Association is a U.S. trade organization representing the interests of greeting card and stationery manufacturers. John Beeder, former president of the Greeting Card Association, says greeting cards are effective tools to communicate important feelings to people you care about: "Anyone feels great when they receive an unexpected card in the mail. For me, there’s nothing like a greeting card to send a special message. I’m proud to be a part of an industry that not only keeps people connected, but uses both imagery and the power of words to help us express our emotions.”

== Louie Awards ==
Since 1988, the Greeting Card Association has held an annual award ceremony for the best greetings cards published that year. The awards are called Louies in recognition of Louis Prang, described as the Father of the American Christmas Card.

== Postcards ==
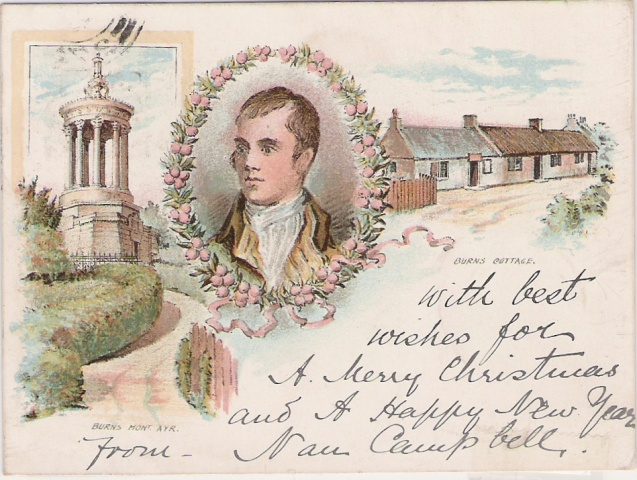
Example of a court card, postmarked 1899, showing Robert Burns and his cottage and monument in Ayr

A postcard or post card is a piece of thick paper or thin cardboard, typically rectangular, intended for writing and mailing without an envelope. Non-rectangular shapes may also be used but are rare.

In some places, one can send a postcard for a lower fee than a letter. Stamp collectors distinguish between postcards (which require a postage stamp) and postal cards (which have the postage pre-printed on them). While a postcard is usually printed and sold by a private company, individual or organization, a postal card is issued by the relevant postal authority (often with pre-printed postage).

Production of postcards blossomed in the late 19th and early 20th centuries. As an easy and quick way for individuals to communicate, they became extremely popular. The study and collecting of postcards is termed deltiology (from Greek deltion, small writing tablet, and the also Greek -logy, the study of).

== See also ==
- Birth announcement
- Cardboard engineering
- Cardmaking
- Birthday card
- Christmas card
- E-card
- Ephemera
- Postcard
- Valentine's Day
- Card (disambiguation)
