= 2025 in the United States =

- Decades: 2000s; 2010s; 2020s; 2030s
- See also: History of the United States (2016–present); Timeline of United States history (2010–present); List of years in the United States

The following is a list of events of the year 2025 in the United States.

Following his election victory in November 2024, Donald Trump was inaugurated as the 47th President of the United States and began his second, nonconsecutive term on January 20. The beginning of his term saw him extensively use executive orders and give increased authority to Elon Musk through the Department of Government Efficiency, leading to mass layoffs of the federal workforce and attempts to eliminate agencies such as USAID. These policies have drawn dozens of lawsuits that have challenged their legality. Trump's return to the presidency also saw the US increase enforcement against illegal immigration through the usage of Immigration and Customs Enforcement (ICE) as well as deportations, a general retreat from corporate America promoting diversity, equity, and inclusion initiatives, increased support for Israel in the Gaza war in addition to direct airstrikes against Iran in June and fluctuating but high increases on tariffs across some of America's trading partners. The Trump Administration worked for negotiations for a Gaza ceasefire-hostage deal. A formalized Gaza ceasefire-hostage deal was reached between Israel and Hamas.

In January, southern California and particularly Greater Los Angeles experienced widespread wildfires, and the Texas Hill Country experienced devastating floods in July. American news media has paid significantly more attention to aviation accidents, both within American borders as well as one in India. Furthermore, March witnessed a blizzard spread across the US and Canada, and under both the Biden administration and Trump's HHS secretary Robert F. Kennedy Jr., American companies, politics and culture have paid increasing attention to food coloring as part of the Make America Healthy Again movement.

The number of executions in 2025 became the highest number to be carried out in the United States in 16 years.

== Incumbents ==
=== Federal government ===
- President:
  - Joe Biden (D-Delaware) (until January 20)
  - Donald Trump (R-Florida) (since January 20)
- Vice President:
  - Kamala Harris (D-California) (until January 20)
  - JD Vance (R-Ohio) (since January 20)
- Chief Justice: John Roberts (Maryland)
- Speaker of the House of Representatives: Mike Johnson (R-Louisiana)
- Senate Majority Leader:
  - Chuck Schumer (D-New York) (until January 3)
  - John Thune (R-South Dakota) (since January 3)
- Congress: 118th (until January 3), 119th (since January 3)

==== State governments ====
Governors and lieutenant governors

=== Governors ===
- Governor of Alabama: Kay Ivey (Republican)
- Governor of Alaska: Mike Dunleavy (Republican)
- Governor of Arizona: Katie Hobbs (Democratic)
- Governor of Arkansas: Sarah Huckabee Sanders (Republican)
- Governor of California: Gavin Newsom (Democratic)
- Governor of Colorado: Jared Polis (Democratic)
- Governor of Connecticut: Ned Lamont (Democratic)
- Governor of Delaware:
  - John Carney (Democratic) (until January 7)
  - Bethany Hall-Long (Democratic) (January 7–21)
  - Matt Meyer (Democratic) (since January 21)
- Governor of Florida: Ron DeSantis (Republican)
- Governor of Georgia: Brian Kemp (Republican)
- Governor of Hawaii: Josh Green (Democratic)
- Governor of Idaho: Brad Little (Republican)
- Governor of Illinois: J. B. Pritzker (Democratic)
- Governor of Indiana: Eric Holcomb (Republican) (until January 13), Mike Braun (Republican) (since January 13)
- Governor of Iowa: Kim Reynolds (Republican)
- Governor of Kansas: Laura Kelly (Democratic)
- Governor of Kentucky: Andy Beshear (Democratic)
- Governor of Louisiana: Jeff Landry (Republican)
- Governor of Maine: Janet Mills (Democratic)
- Governor of Maryland: Wes Moore (Democratic)
- Governor of Massachusetts: Maura Healey (Democratic)
- Governor of Michigan: Gretchen Whitmer (Democratic)
- Governor of Minnesota: Tim Walz (Democratic)
- Governor of Mississippi: Tate Reeves (Republican)
- Governor of Missouri: Mike Parson (Republican) (until January 13), Mike Kehoe (Republican) (since January 13)
- Governor of Montana: Greg Gianforte (Republican)
- Governor of Nebraska: Jim Pillen (Republican)
- Governor of Nevada: Joe Lombardo (Republican)
- Governor of New Hampshire: Chris Sununu (Republican) (until January 9), Kelly Ayotte (Republican) (since January 9)
- Governor of New Jersey: Phil Murphy (Democratic)
- Governor of New Mexico: Michelle Lujan Grisham (Democratic)
- Governor of New York: Kathy Hochul (Democratic)
- Governor of North Carolina: Roy Cooper (Democratic) (until January 1), Josh Stein (Democratic) (since January 1)
- Governor of North Dakota: Kelly Armstrong (Republican)
- Governor of Ohio: Mike DeWine (Republican)
- Governor of Oklahoma: Kevin Stitt (Republican)
- Governor of Oregon: Tina Kotek (Democratic)
- Governor of Pennsylvania: Josh Shapiro (Democratic)
- Governor of Rhode Island: Daniel McKee (Democratic)
- Governor of South Carolina: Henry McMaster (Republican)
- Governor of South Dakota: Kristi Noem (Republican) (until January 25), Larry Rhoden (Republican) (since January 25)
- Governor of Tennessee: Bill Lee (Republican)
- Governor of Texas: Greg Abbott (Republican)
- Governor of Utah: Spencer Cox (Republican)
- Governor of Vermont: Phil Scott (Republican)
- Governor of Virginia: Glenn Youngkin (Republican)
- Governor of Washington: Jay Inslee (Democratic) (until January 15), Bob Ferguson (Democratic) (since January 15)
- Governor of West Virginia: Jim Justice (Republican) (until January 13), Patrick Morrisey (Republican) (since January 13)
- Governor of Wisconsin: Tony Evers (Democratic)
- Governor of Wyoming: Mark Gordon (Republican)

=== Lieutenant governors ===
- Lieutenant Governor of Alabama: Will Ainsworth (Republican)
- Lieutenant Governor of Alaska: Nancy Dahlstrom (Republican)
- Lieutenant Governor of Arkansas: Leslie Rutledge (Republican)
- Lieutenant Governor of California: Eleni Kounalakis (Democratic)
- Lieutenant Governor of Colorado: Dianne Primavera (Democratic)
- Lieutenant Governor of Connecticut: Susan Bysiewicz (Democratic)
- Lieutenant Governor of Delaware:
  - Bethany Hall-Long (Democratic) (until January 7)
  - Vacant (January 7–21)
  - Kyle Evans Gay (Democratic) (since January 21)
- Lieutenant Governor of Florida:
  - Jeanette Nuñez (Republican) (until February 16)
  - Vacant (February 16 – August 12)
  - Jay Collins (Republican) (since August 12)
- Lieutenant Governor of Georgia: Burt Jones (Republican)
- Lieutenant Governor of Hawaii: Sylvia Luke (Democratic)
- Lieutenant Governor of Idaho: Scott Bedke (Republican)
- Lieutenant Governor of Illinois: Juliana Stratton (Democratic)
- Lieutenant Governor of Indiana: Suzanne Crouch (Republican) (until January 13), Micah Beckwith (Republican) (since January 13)
- Lieutenant Governor of Iowa: Chris Cournoyer (Republican)
- Lieutenant Governor of Kansas: David Toland (Democratic)
- Lieutenant Governor of Kentucky: Jacqueline Coleman (Democratic)
- Lieutenant Governor of Louisiana: Billy Nungesser (Republican)
- Lieutenant Governor of Maryland: Aruna Miller (Democratic)
- Lieutenant Governor of Massachusetts: Kim Driscoll (Democratic)
- Lieutenant Governor of Michigan: Garlin Gilchrist (Democratic)
- Lieutenant Governor of Minnesota: Peggy Flanagan (Democratic)
- Lieutenant Governor of Mississippi: Delbert Hosemann (Republican)
- Lieutenant Governor of Missouri: Mike Kehoe (Republican) (until January 13), David Wasinger (R) (since January 13)
- Lieutenant Governor of Montana: Kristen Juras (Republican)
- Lieutenant Governor of Nebraska: Joe Kelly (Republican)
- Lieutenant Governor of Nevada: Stavros Anthony (Democratic)
- Lieutenant Governor of New Jersey: Tahesha Way (Democratic)
- Lieutenant Governor of New Mexico: Howie Morales (Democratic)
- Lieutenant Governor of New York: Antonio Delgado (Democratic)
- Lieutenant Governor of North Carolina: Mark Robinson (Republican) (until January 1), Rachel Hunt (Democratic) (since January 1)
- Lieutenant Governor of North Dakota: Michelle Strinden (Republican)
- Lieutenant Governor of Ohio:
  - Jon Husted (Republican) (until January 21)
  - Vacant (January 21–February 14)
  - Jim Tressel (Republican) (since February 14)
- Lieutenant Governor of Oklahoma: Matt Pinnell (Republican)
- Lieutenant Governor of Pennsylvania: Austin Davis (Democratic)
- Lieutenant Governor of Rhode Island: Sabina Matos (Democratic)
- Lieutenant Governor of South Carolina: Pamela Evette (Republican)
- Lieutenant Governor of South Dakota:
  - Larry Rhoden (Republican) (until January 25)
  - Vacant (January 25–30)
  - Tony Venhuizen (Republican) (since January 30)
- Lieutenant Governor of Tennessee: Randy McNally (Republican)
- Lieutenant Governor of Texas: Dan Patrick (Republican)
- Lieutenant Governor of Utah: Deidre Henderson (Republican)
- Lieutenant Governor of Vermont: David Zuckerman (Progressive) (until January 9), John S. Rodgers (Republican) (since January 9)
- Lieutenant Governor of Virginia: Winsome Earle-Sears (Republican)
- Lieutenant Governor of Washington: Denny Heck (Democratic)
- Lieutenant Governor of West Virginia: Craig Blair (Republican) (until January 8), Randy Smith (Republican) (since January 8)
- Lieutenant Governor of Wisconsin: Sara Rodriguez (Democratic)

== Elections ==
Elections were held on November 4 of this year. The off-year election included gubernatorial and state legislative elections in a few states, as well as numerous mayoral races, and a variety of other local offices on the ballot.

=== Off-cycle elections ===
- April 1: The 2025 Wisconsin Supreme Court election takes place, with liberal Susan M. Crawford beating conservative Brad Schimel in a non-partisan election.

=== Special elections ===
- April 1
  - Republican Matt Gaetz of Florida's 1st congressional district is announced as president-elect Trump's nominee for U.S. attorney general on November 13, 2024, leading Gaetz to resign on the same day. However, he withdraws his nomination a week later and declines to be seated for the 119th United States Congress despite winning re-election. Republican Jimmy Patronis wins the special election to succeed Gaetz despite a strong performance from Democrat Gay Valimont.
  - Republican Mike Waltz of Florida's 6th congressional district resigned on January 20 to take office as president Trump's national security advisor. Republican Randy Fine defeats Democrat Josh Well in the subsequent special election.
- September 9 – Due to his battle with esophageal cancer, Democrat Gerry Connolly initially announces his intention to retire at the end of his term in April, although he would later die on May 21. In the special election, Democrat James Walkinshaw wins Virginia's 11th congressional district by a wide margin.
- September 23 – Democrat Raúl Grijalva of Arizona's 7th congressional district dies from complications of cancer treatment on March 13. His daughter Adelita Grijalva wins the special election to succeed him, although her swearing-in is delayed by Speaker Johnson amidst the ongoing government shutdown.
- November 4 – Democrat Sylvester Turner dies on March 5, serving just two months in Congress and being the second representative for Texas's 18th congressional district to die in a one-year period, after Sheila Jackson Lee. The nonpartisan special election results in a runoff that extends into January.
- December 2 – Republican Mark Green of Tennessee's 7th congressional district resigns on July 20 to work in the private sector. Republican Matt Van Epps defeats Democrat Aftyn Behn in a special election, with Democratic voters significantly improving their margins in a deep red district.

=== Referendums ===
- March 29 – Louisiana voters reject both Amendment 3 and Amendment 4. The former proposed for the state legislature to determine in state law which felonies can result in a juvenile being tried as an adult, while the latter would have required special elections to the Louisiana Supreme Court to occur at the earliest possible election date.
- April 1 – Wisconsin voters approve Question 1 by a vote of 63% to 37%, which establishes a constitutional requirement to provide photographic identification in order to vote.
- May 3 – Residents of Starbase, Texas, vote to incorporate the City of Starbase, a then-unincorporated area of Cameron County that includes SpaceX Starbase.
- May 6 – Ohio voters approve Issue 2 with a supermajority vote of 68% to 32%, providing $250 million per year for ten years towards the State Capital Improvement Program, which has been active since 1987.
- November 4
  - Texas voters will decide on 17 proposed amendments, the most appearing on a single Texas ballot since 2003. One of the more notable amendments is Proposition 14, which would allocate $3 billion from the state budget to establish the Dementia Prevention and Research Institute of Texas.
  - California voters approve Proposition 50, which allows the state to use a new, legislature-drawn congressional district map rather than the current one drawn by the California Citizens Redistricting Commission. The new map is a Democratic gerrymander that intends to weaken Republican performance and strengthen Democrats in swing districts, a direct response to the Republican gerrymander in Texas.
  - Washington voters approve Resolution 8201, which allows the state to invest in the stock market using funds from the Long-Term Services and Supports Trust Fund, a long-term care insurance program.

== Events ==
=== January ===
A Tesla Cybertruck detonates in front of the Trump International Hotel in Las Vegas, Nevada. (January 1)

- January 1
  - New Orleans truck attack: Fourteen people (excluding the perpetrator) are killed and 57 others are injured in a vehicle-ramming attack along Bourbon Street in New Orleans, Louisiana. The suspect is killed in the attack.
  - Las Vegas Cybertruck explosion: A Tesla Cybertruck catches on fire and explodes outside Trump International Hotel Las Vegas in Nevada, killing one person and injuring seven others.
  - Honduran President Xiomara Castro warns that she might remove all US military bases from Honduras and seek to cancel the military cooperation with the US if President-elect Trump fulfills his threat to order mass deportations of Hondurans when he takes office on January 20.
  - Public Domain Day: Works published in 1929, including Popeye, Tintin, and Best Picture Academy Award winner The Broadway Melody, enter the public domain in the US.
- January 2
  - The US Court of Appeals for the Sixth Circuit rules in Ohio Telecom Association v. FCC that the Federal Communications Commission cannot enforce net neutrality.
  - According to the Syrian Observatory for Human Rights, US forces are deploying a new convoy to areas controlled by the Syrian Democratic Forces in Kobani, Aleppo Governorate, as part of operations to establish a new US military base in north-eastern Syria. This is denied a day later by the Department of Defense.
- January 3
  - The 119th Congress begins. Vice President Kamala Harris officiates the swearing-in of senators, while representatives vote to re-elect Mike Johnson as speaker of the House.
  - President Joe Biden blocks the proposed acquisition of U.S. Steel by Nippon Steel.
  - Surgeon General Vivek Murthy calls for cancer warnings on alcohol.
  - SpaceX successfully launches the United Arab Emirates Space Agency's communications satellite Thuraya 4-NGS via a Falcon 9 rocket from Cape Canaveral Space Force Station in Florida.
- January 4
  - Kentucky Governor Andy Beshear declares a state of emergency for Kentucky, United States, amidst the upcoming winter storm.
- January 5
  - New York City enacts a congestion charge for vehicles entering Lower and Midtown Manhattan below 60th Street, becoming the first city in the US to do so. All proceeds go to the Metropolitan Transportation Authority, which plans to invest in long-term transportation initiatives citywide.
  - The National Weather Service warns of severe weather disruption as a winter storm emerges in the central US and begins to move east, bringing heavy snow and freezing temperatures.
  - The State Department notifies Congress of a planned $8 billion arms sale to Israel consisting of air-to-air and Hellfire missiles, artillery shells, and other ammunitions.
- January 6
  - Due to harsh weather and snowstorms, a water treatment facility malfunctions and floods, causing the entire city of Richmond, Virginia to completely lose access to running water. As a result, several surrounding counties also suffer from similar issues.
  - Biden bans new oil and gas drilling along the majority of American coastlines.
  - Congress convenes in a joint session for the Electoral College vote count, the final procedure of the 2024 presidential election.

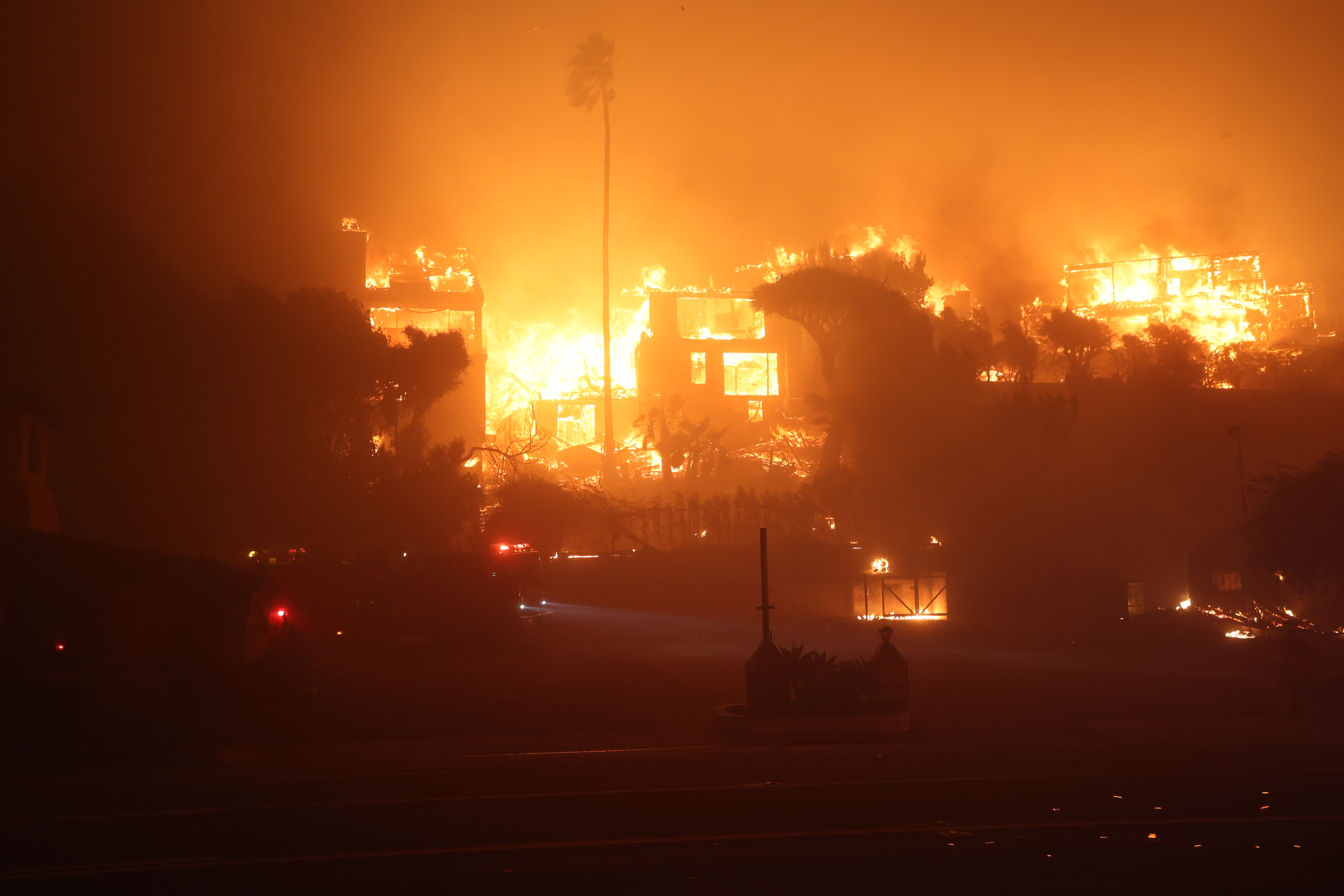
The Palisades Fire, part of the January 2025 Southern California wildfires. (January 7)

- January 7
  - Los Angeles experiences the most destructive wildfire in its history, fueled by strong winds and prolonged drought conditions. Thousands of structures are destroyed, including most of Sunset Boulevard. Five deaths are reported, while 180,000 people are evacuated, with fires continuing for days.
  - Hussain Sajwani announces a $20 billion investment in the US data center industry over the coming years.
  - Mark Zuckerberg announces that Meta will remove fact-checkers for Facebook, Instagram, and Threads, replacing them with a community-orientated system, similar to Community Notes.
  - President-elect Trump's son Donald Trump Jr. makes a personal visit to Greenland weeks after Trump announced that "ownership and control of Greenland is an absolute necessity". In response to the visit, Danish prime minister Mette Frederiksen states that "Greenland belongs to the Greenlanders".
  - The Treasury imposes sanctions on Hungarian cabinet minister Antal Rogán for alleged corruption, accusing him of using his position to secure financial benefits for himself and political allies.
  - The US accuses the Rapid Support Forces of committing genocide in Sudan during the ongoing civil war and imposes sanctions on the group's leader Hemedti.
- January 8 – The California wildfires spread to more areas.
- January 9
  - The state funeral of Jimmy Carter is held in Washington, D.C.
  - The House votes 243 to 140 to sanction the ICC for issuing arrest warrants for Benjamin Netanyahu and former Israeli Defense Minister Yoav Gallant.
  - Senate majority leader John Thune promises swift consideration of the Illegitimate Court Counteraction Act so President-elect Trump can sign it into law shortly after taking office. Under the act, any foreigner who investigates, arrests, detains or prosecutes US citizens or those of an allied country, including Israel, would be sanctioned along with their family members.
- January 10
  - Vice President-elect JD Vance resigns from the Senate.
  - Trump is sentenced to an "unconditional discharge" for 34 counts of falsifying business records in his New York hush money case.
  - The US government imposes a new series of sanctions targeting Russia's energy sector, including the Gazprom Neft and Surgutneftegas oil companies.
  - US authorities announce an increased $25 million reward for information leading to the arrest of Venezuelan president Nicolás Maduro.
  - The Securities and Exchange Commission announces that former WWE CEO Vince McMahon has agreed to pay a $400,000 fine and reimburse $1.3 million to WWE as part of a settlement to drop accounting fraud charges.
  - 2025 California wildfires:
    - Los Angeles authorities declare a local health emergency due to poor air quality resulting from the ongoing wildfires.
    - The evacuation area in the Palisades Fire is expanded.
    - Governor Newsom calls for an independent investigation into how firefighters have struggled with water supplies while tackling the wildfires.
- January 11 – Incoming US Middle East Envoy Steve Witkoff meets with Israeli Prime Minister Benjamin Netanyahu to secure a ceasefire deal in Gaza Strip before Trump's inauguration on January 20.
- January 12
  - Foreign ministers and senior officers of Arab countries, the European Union, US, United Kingdom and Turkey hold in Riyadh a series of diplomatic meetings focused on Syria.
  - Israeli Prime Minister Benjamin Netanyahu and President Joe Biden discuss efforts to reach a deal to solve the Gaza war hostage crisis and a ceasefire to end the war.
- January 13 – AccuWeather releases a preliminary estimate of the total physical and economic losses caused by the ongoing wildfires in Southern California of between $250–275 billion, a figure attributed to exceptionally high property values in and near Santa Monica, which would surpass their estimates of the costs of the entire 2020 US wildfire season as well as Hurricane Helene in 2024.
- January 14
  - Hamas officials say that they have accepted a draft agreement for a potential ceasefire as well as the release of hostages. Mediators in the US and Qatar also state that this is the closest that both sides have been to a ceasefire agreement so far.
  - President Biden announces that the US will remove Cuba from its state sponsors of terrorism list as part of a prisoner release deal.
  - The Armenian Foreign Minister, Ararat Mirzoyan, and Secretary of State Antony Blinken, sign in Washington, D.C. a Strategic Partnership Charter between Armenia and the US.
- January 15
  - Israel and Hamas reach a diplomatic agreement mediated by Egypt, Qatar, and the US to initiate a ceasefire and an end to military operations in Gaza, as well as to facilitate the exchange of hostages and prisoners, marking the first major cessation of hostilities since November 2023.
  - The Food and Drug Administration (FDA) bans the usage of Red No. 3 artificial food coloring, due to research showing that the food coloring is carcinogenic.
  - The Yemeni Houthi group claims that it launched a missile attack targeting the USS Harry S. Truman aircraft carrier and accompanying warships of the US Navy in the Red Sea.
  - A SpaceX Falcon 9 rocket lifts off from the Kennedy Space Center in Florida, carrying the American Blue Ghost M1 moon lander from Firefly Aerospace and the Japanese Hakuto-R Mission 2 moon lander from ispace.
- January 16
  - The Treasury Department sanctions the head of the Sudanese Armed Forces, Abdel Fattah al-Burhan, for "destabilizing Sudan and undermining the goal of a democratic transition" to a civilian-led government.
  - Blue Origin launches its New Glenn rocket for the first time from Cape Canaveral Space Force Station in Florida. The rocket's second stage, carrying a prototype Blue Ring spacecraft, successfully reaches a geocentric orbit, but its reusable first stage is lost during landing.
  - SpaceX launches its seventh test flight of the Starship launch vehicle, with an improved second stage out of its Starbase launch site in Texas. The company catches the first stage, but the second stage breaks up shortly before engine shutdown.
  - 2025 California wildfires: It is reported that the Eaton Fire, which has burned over 14,000 acres and has killed 17 people, is 65% contained.
- January 17
  - The Supreme Court upholds the provisions of the Protecting Americans from Foreign Adversary Controlled Applications Act banning social media platform TikTok unless it is sold by ByteDance.
  - Trump announces that his upcoming second inauguration will be moved indoors at the US Capitol Rotunda due to cold temperatures, making it the first to be held indoors since the second 'public' inauguration of the 40th U.S. President, Ronald Reagan in 1985.
  - The Treasury Department sanctions a cybersecurity company and hacker, both with ties to China's Ministry of State Security, for their alleged roles in hacking American telecommunications companies (Salt Typhoon).

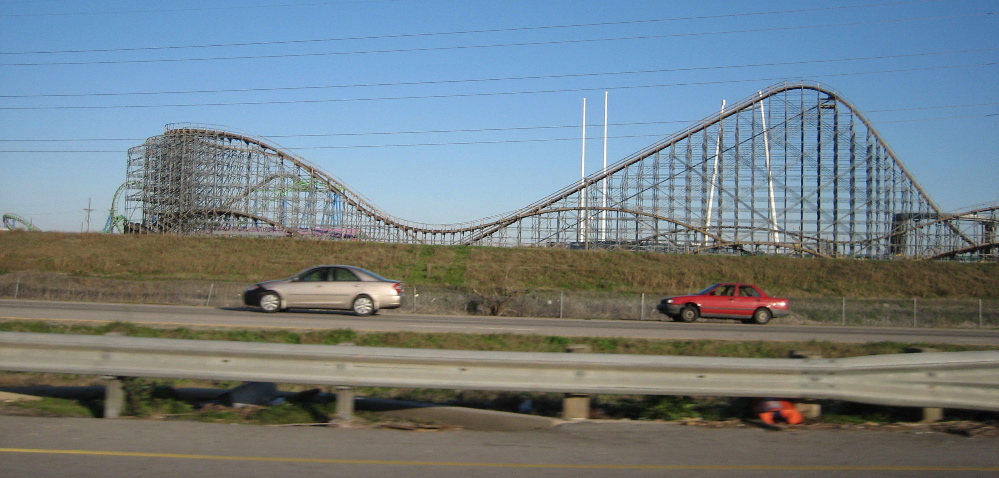
The Mega Zeph wooden rollercoaster at Six Flags New Orleans catches fire (January 18).

- January 18
  - Ahead of Trump's second term, the Women's March hosts protests at Columbus Circle in Washington, D.C. The People's March on Washington is also held on the same day.
  - The Mega Zeph roller coaster at the former Six Flags New Orleans amusement park catches fire.
  - In American football, the Washington Commanders upset the Detroit Lions, 45–31, to reach the NFC Championship game, their first since the 1991 season when they were known as the Redskins.
  - TikTok voluntarily goes offline in the US, hours before a new law banning the platform comes into effect.
- January 19 – ByteDance temporarily and voluntarily shutters its services TikTok, CapCut, Lemon8, and Marvel Snap in the U.S. due to uncertainty of whether the Biden administration would enforce the ban. Biden did not enforce the ban and left the enforcement to Trump, who promised not to enforce it either, resulting in ByteDance restoring its U.S. services.

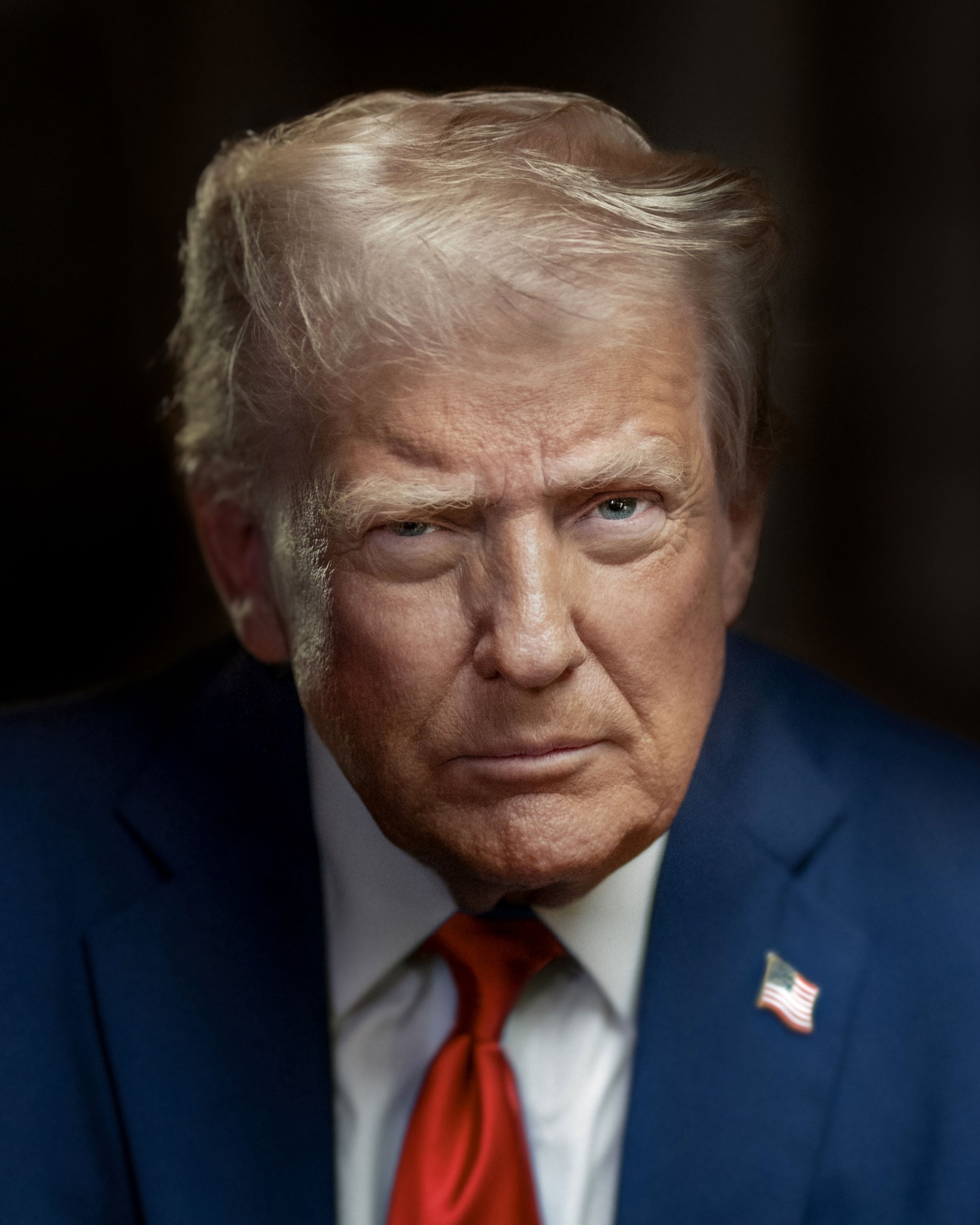
January 20: Donald Trump becomes the 47th U.S. president.

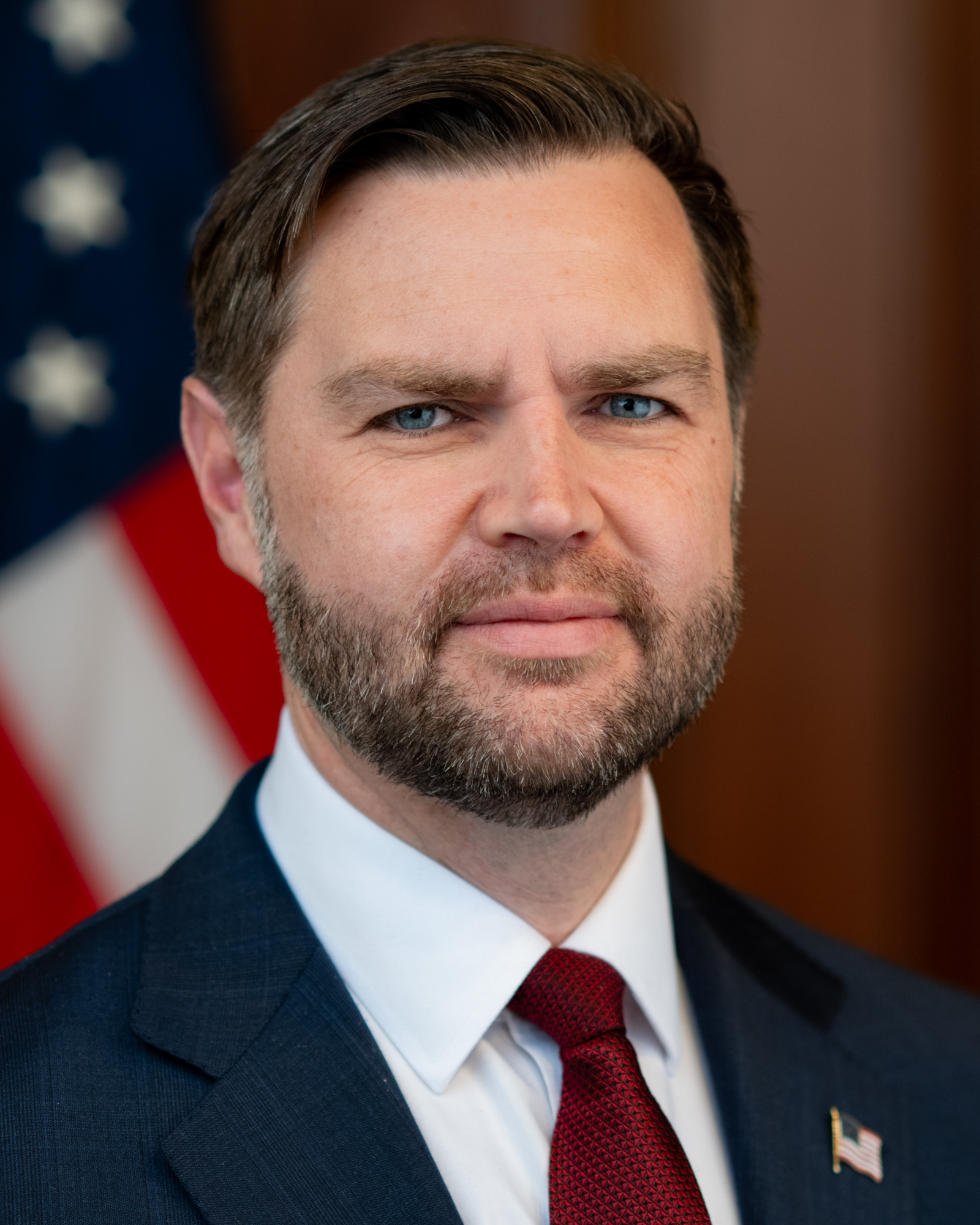
January 20: JD Vance becomes the 50th U.S. vice president.

- January 20
  - Donald Trump is inaugurated in Washington, D.C. as the 47th president of the US for a second, non-consecutive term, with JD Vance sworn in as the 50th vice president of the US.
  - Trump issues roughly 1,500 pardons and six commutations to people charged in connection with the January 6 US Capitol attack.
  - National Action Network founder and civil rights activist Al Sharpton holds a rally on Martin Luther King Jr. Day, the same day as the inauguration, to honor MLK's legacy and protest the second presidency of Trump.
  - Trump signs an executive order directing federal agencies to refer to the northernmost portion of the Gulf of Mexico as the "Gulf of America" and Denali as its 1917–2015 federal designation, Mount McKinley.
  - The US Senate unanimously confirms Marco Rubio as Secretary of State, making him the first Cabinet official of Trump's second term to be confirmed by the Senate. Rubio also becomes the first Latino American to serve as Secretary of State.
  - Trump officially creates the Department of Government Efficiency (DOGE) led by Elon Musk aimed at cutting spending of the US government. Within minutes of the announcement, government employee unions, watchdog groups, and public interest organizations sued over this executive order.
  - Trump signs an executive order to delay enforcement of the law banning TikTok in the US for 75 days.
  - Trump signs the Putting America First In International Environmental Agreements executive order directing the US withdrawal from the Paris Agreement.
  - Trump signs an executive order directing the US withdrawal from the World Health Organization.
  - Trump signs his first executive orders on gender and immigration, and also signs an order ending usage of the CBP One app.
  - Trump revokes Biden's removal of Cuba from the state sponsors of terrorism list.
  - Ohio State wins the NCAA CFP National Championship, beating Notre Dame 34–23.
- January 21
  - Multiple brush fires spread by hurricane-force winds erupt in San Diego County, California, prompting evacuation orders.
  - Much of Canada and the contiguous US are impacted by a cold wave, killing one person near Milwaukee, Wisconsin. Historic snowfall is expected in the Southern US, and historic blizzard and whiteout conditions are expected on the Gulf Coast.
  - Two Americans held in Afghanistan are freed in exchange for a Taliban fighter in the US. The deal is brokered by Qatar and finalized during the final hours of the outgoing Biden administration.
  - Oracle Corporation, MGX, SoftBank Group, OpenAI, and other partners have announced the launch of The Stargate Project, a joint venture focused on developing AI infrastructure in the US. The initiative includes a projected $500 billion investment and aims to create 100,000 new jobs in the US by 2029.
  - Trump pardons Ross Ulbricht, the creator of the Silk Road. Ulbricht was serving a life sentence for charges including conspiracy to commit money laundering, hacking, and drug trafficking.
- January 22
  - The death toll of a historic winter storm event on the Gulf Coast of the US rises to nine. 8 in (20 cm) of snow falls at Louis Armstrong New Orleans International Airport in Louisiana, and the statewide snowfall record in Florida is broken as over 5.5 in (14 cm) falls in Molino.
  - The House passes the Laken Riley Act, which Trump signs on January 29.
  - Trump re-designates the Yemeni Houthi movement as a foreign terrorist organization.
  - A school shooting at Antioch High School in Nashville, Tennessee, kills two students and injures two others.
  - The Trump administration imposes an immediate freeze on meetings – such as grant review panels – as well as travel, communications, and hiring at the National Institutes of Health (NIH), impacting $47.4 billion worth of activities.
- January 23
  - Trump signs an executive order for the public release of classified documents relating to the assassinations of John F Kennedy, Robert F Kennedy, and Martin Luther King Jr.
  - U.S. District Judge for Washington John C. Coughenour temporarily blocks Trump's executive order attempting to end birthright citizenship, calling it "blatantly unconstitutional".
  - The U.S. Department of State bans consular posts from flying any flags other than the U.S. flag as part of the Trump administration targeting several instances during the Biden administration when LGBTQ rainbow flag displays and Black Lives Matter flag displays were flown at embassies abroad.
- January 24
  - Mexico denies a request from the US to allow a military aircraft deporting migrants from the U.S. to land in Mexico.
  - The State Department freezes nearly all foreign aid programs except military aid to Israel and Egypt and emergency food programs.
  - Pete Hegseth is confirmed as U.S. Secretary of Defense in a 51–50 vote after Vice President JD Vance casts the tie breaking vote, making him the first Vice President to cast a tiebreaker vote on a Cabinet nominee since Mike Pence did so in 2017 to confirm then-Education Secretary Betsy DeVos.
  - Spirit Airlines announces a ban on passengers who wear "lewd" clothing or have "offensive" tattoos.
- January 26
  - Colombian President Gustavo Petro blocks two U.S. military aircraft carrying deported Colombians as part of Trump's immigration crackdown from landing in his country. In response, Trump enacts a 25% tariff on all goods traded to the U.S. from Colombia, which will be raised to 50% in one week; Colombia accepts the deportation flights a day later.
  - Rubio announces the release of American citizen Anastasia Nufer from a prison in Belarus.
  - In soccer, Chelsea Women sign American defender Naomi Girma from San Diego Wave for a world-record fee of US$1.1 million, making her the most expensive woman player and the first million-dollar transfer in women's soccer.
  - 2024–25 NFL playoffs: In American football, the Philadelphia Eagles and Kansas City Chiefs win their respective conference championship games for a Super Bowl rematch of Super Bowl LVII.

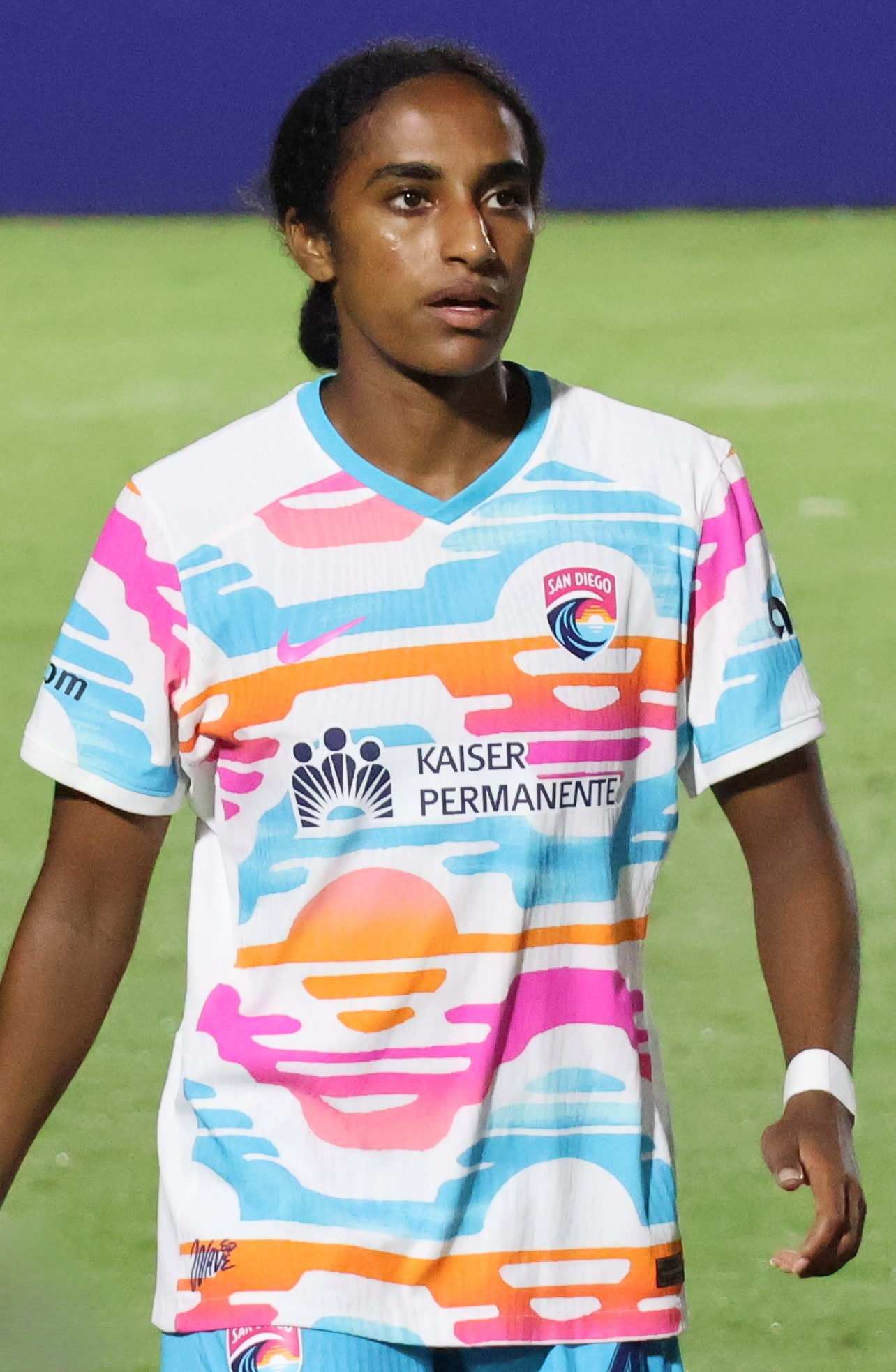
January 27: Naomi Girma, who formerly played for San Diego Wave, is signed to Chelsea Women FC for a record $1.1 million, making her the most expensive woman player.

- January 27
  - The Nasdaq falls sharply in response to DeepSeek, a Chinese competitor to OpenAI's ChatGPT. Chip giant Nvidia loses $600bn of its value, the biggest drop for a single company in U.S. stock market history.
  - US federal government grant pause: The Office of Management and Budget acting director Matthew Vaeth orders federal government agencies to temporarily pause all federal financial assistance programs, except for Medicare and Social Security, that could be implicated by select executive orders from Trump.
  - Trump signs an executive order eliminating "gender radicalism in the military", targeting transgender troops in the military, and another executive order that mandates a process to develop an American Iron Dome.
  - The Idaho House of Representatives votes for a resolution that calls for the Supreme Court to reconsider its 2015 Obergefell v. Hodges same-sex marriage decision.
- January 28
  - A F-35 fighter jet crashes and explodes at Eielson Air Force Base in Alaska.
  - US federal judge Loren AliKhan temporarily blocks Trump's executive order to pause funding for federal assistance in the country.
  - The South Dakota Senate narrowly votes for a bill requiring public schools to display the Ten Commandments in every classroom. The bill is similar to a 2024 law passed in Louisiana.
  - Boom Technology's XB-1 trijet supersonic demonstrator becomes the first privately funded jet-powered plane to break the sound barrier at Mojave Air and Space Port.
- January 29
  - 2025 Potomac River mid-air collision: A PSA Airlines Bombardier CRJ-700 operating as American Eagle Flight 5342 collides with a U.S. Army Sikorsky UH-60 Black Hawk over the Potomac River in Washington, D.C. on approach to Reagan National Airport, killing all passengers on both aircraft and causing a shutdown of flights in and out of the airport.
  - US Middle East Envoy Steve Witkoff visits the Gaza Strip and meets with Israeli PM Benjamin Netanyahu to assure that the ceasefire remains intact.
  - Trump announces plans to transform the US detention facility in Guantanamo Bay into a holding center for undocumented immigrants, capable of hosting 30,000.
  - Former Senator Bob Menendez of New Jersey is sentenced to 11 years in prison, following his conviction on bribery and corruption charges.
- January 30
  - The US Federal Drug Administration approves Vertex Pharmaceuticals' new Journavx drug, a non-opioid analgesic used to treat acute pain and potentially eliminate the risks of opioid addiction and overdose.
  - Trump orders the Department of Agriculture to remove any mention of climate change on its websites.
- January 31
  - The Palisades Fire and Eaton Fire, the last two of the January 2025 Southern California wildfires, are contained.
  - A medical transport jet crashes into a northeastern Philadelphia neighborhood, killing all four passengers and two crew members on board. Additionally, one person on the ground is killed and 19 injured.
  - Venezuela frees six American hostages after U.S. Special Presidential Envoy for Special Missions Richard Grenell meets with Venezuelan president Nicolás Maduro.
  - DOGE representatives are granted full access to the federal treasury, allowing Elon Musk and his team to monitor and potentially limit government spending.

=== February ===
- February 1
  - Trump signs an executive order imposing a 25% tariff on goods from Canada and Mexico, and a 10% tariffs on goods imported from China. Canada and Mexico threaten retaliation while China vows to take the matter to the World Trade Organization.
  - Trump says he has ordered the US military to carry out airstrikes against Islamic State positions in Somalia. The strikes targeted a series of cave systems used by the terror group.
  - The Democratic National Committee chairmanship election is held by party voting members at the DNC's Winter Meeting, electing Ken Martin as the next Chair of the Democratic National Committee.
  - 2024–25 NBA season: In basketball, the Dallas Mavericks, Utah Jazz, and Los Angeles Lakers are involved in a controversial trade that sends Luka Dončić to the Lakers for Anthony Davis.

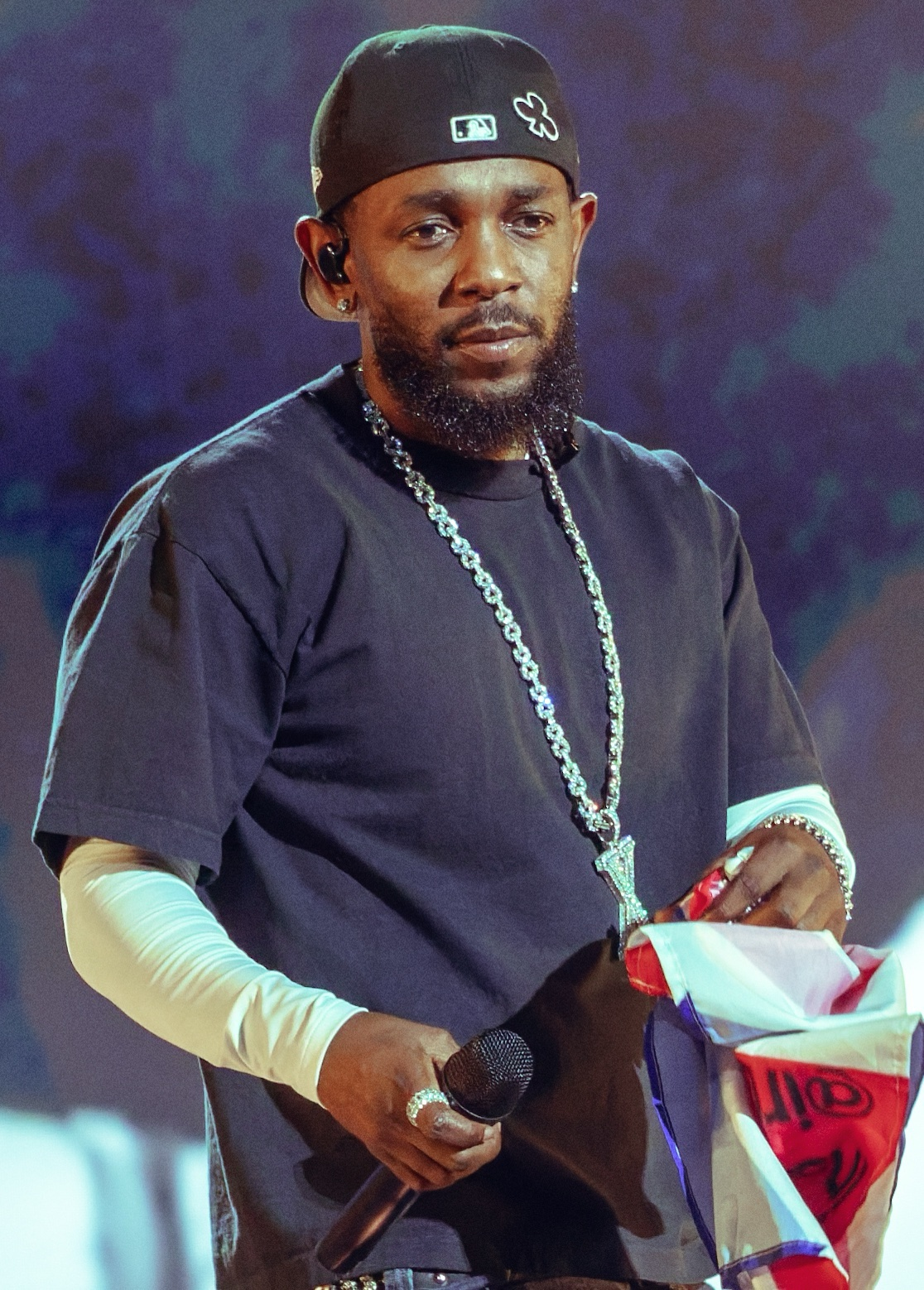
February 2: Kendrick Lamar's (pictured) song and diss track against Drake wins five awards at the Grammy Awards.

- February 2
  - The 67th Annual Grammy Awards are held at the Crypto.com Arena in Los Angeles, honoring the best in music from September 2023 to August 2024. "Not Like Us" by Kendrick Lamar wins Record of the Year while Cowboy Carter by Beyoncé wins Album of the Year.
  - Thousands of demonstrators protest against immigration policies implemented by Trump in downtown Los Angeles, blocking the Hollywood Freeway.
  - The Puntland military spokersperson claims that US airstrikes against ISIL have killed 46 fighters in the Cal Miskaad Mountains, a remote area in northeastern region Bari, Somalia.
  - Secretary of State Marco Rubio travels to Panama in his first foreign trip in the position and urges Panamanian President José Raúl Mulino to reduce Chinese influence in the Panama Canal. In response, Mulino said that his country won't renew its contracts with China's Belt and Road Initiative when they expire.
  - In ice hockey, Jonathan Quick becomes the first American-born goalie to reach 400 wins.
- February 3
  - Mexican President Claudia Sheinbaum, Canadian Prime Minister Justin Trudeau, and Trump announce they have agreed to delay 25% of tariffs on Mexico and Canada for a month in exchange for boosting security along their respective borders.
  - Elon Musk announces that the US Agency for International Development (USAID) will be shut down and merged into the State Department.
  - Trump says he is stopping funding to South Africa over a land seizure law.
  - Salvadoran president Nayib Bukele makes an offer to Secretary of State Marco Rubio to accept convicted "dangerous American criminals" and incarcerate them at the Terrorism Confinement Center in El Salvador in exchange for a fee.
- February 4
  - The US implements a 10% across-the-board tariff on Chinese products and eliminates the de minimis exemption for exports from China. In response, China imposes retaliatory tariffs on energy products, farm equipment, and automobiles from the US, effective February 10, and export controls on critical minerals. It also adds US-based PVH Group and Illumina Inc. to its unreliable entities list and launches a probe into technology company Google for alleged anti-trust violations.
  - The State Department orders the closure of all overseas missions of USAID and recalls thousands of USAID staff to the US ahead of the agency's shutdown.
  - Trump announces that the US will take control of the Gaza Strip in an agreement with Israel. Trump also says Palestinians will have no choice but to leave the territory and that the US military will be in charge of Gaza's reconstruction to turn the area into "The Riviera of the Middle East" for "the world's people."
  - Trump signs a presidential memorandum reimposing a policy of maximum pressure against Iran.
  - The Senate confirms Pam Bondi as US Attorney General, making her the third female to run the Justice Department.
  - Two people are killed and four others are injured after a mass shooting at a warehouse in New Albany, Ohio.
- February 5
  - The Postal Service says it is temporarily refusing inbound parcels from China and Hong Kong effective immediately.
  - Protests against Trump: Protests occur in cities across the US against Trump, his administration, Elon Musk, and Project 2025. The protests are referred to as 50501.
- February 6
  - Trump signs an executive order imposing sanctions on International Criminal Court officials that assist investigations into US citizens or those of its allies, namely Israel. A day later, 79 countries jointly speak out in a statement against the sanctions.
  - Bering Air Flight 445: A Cessna 208B Grand Caravan carrying ten people in Alaska goes missing on a flight from Unalakleet to Nome. It is later found crashed, leaving no survivors.
  - NASA's Center for Near-Earth Object Studies says that the probability of asteroid 2024 YR4 impacting Earth on 22 December 2032 has increased to 2.3%, or a (1-in-43) chance, following further observations of its trajectory. More observations are planned in the coming months to gather data on the asteroid before it moves too far away from Earth-based telescopes to be accurately observed.

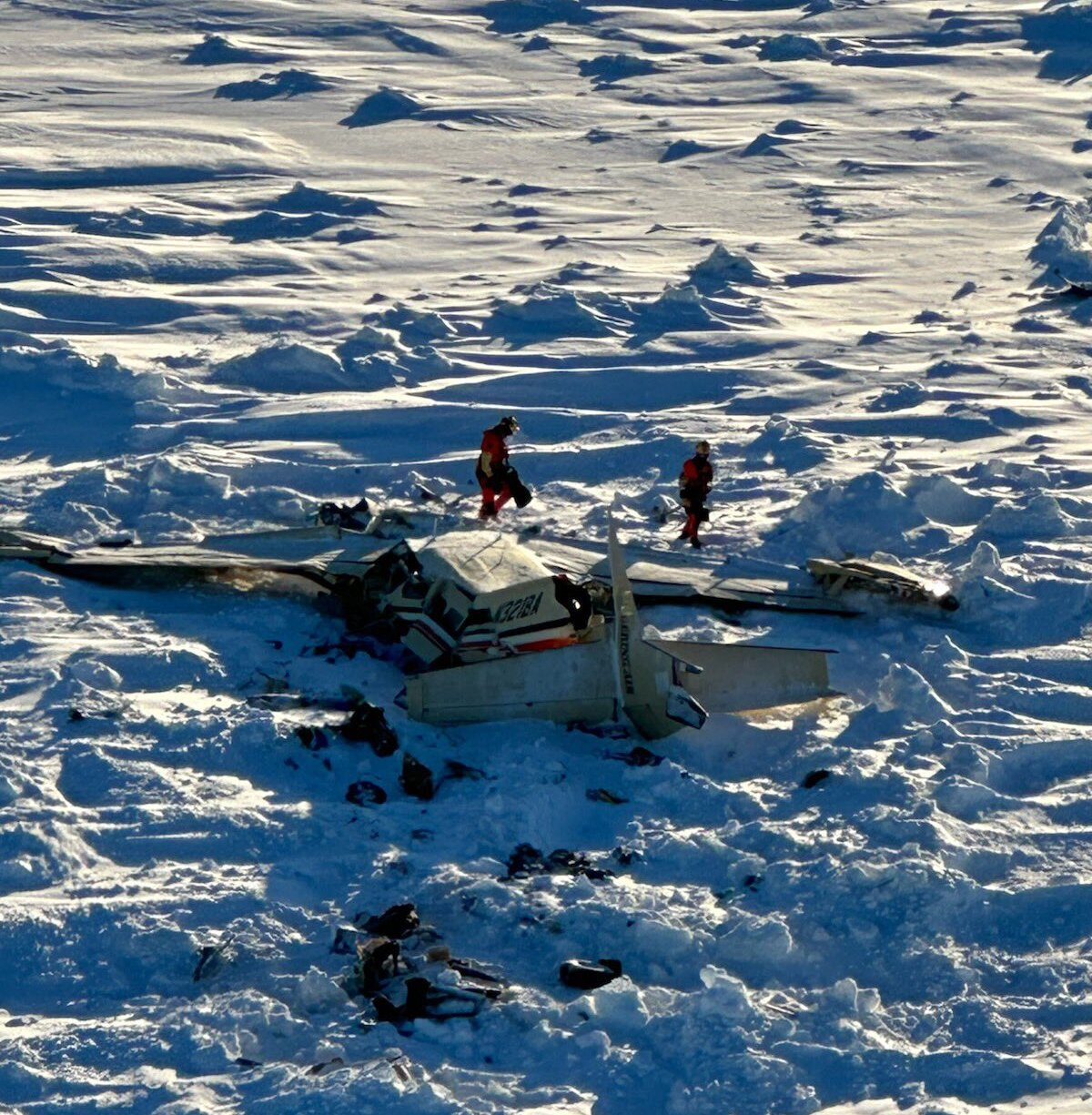
February 6: A Bering Air Cessna 208B goes missing in Alaska and is later found crashed.

- February 7
  - US federal judge of the D.C. District Court Carl J. Nichols temporarily blocks Trump's executive order to place over 2,200 USAID employees on paid leave.
  - Vice President JD Vance and National Security Advisor Michael Waltz are announced in charge of a potential TikTok sale.
  - New York City officials order the closure of all live poultry markets in the city as well as in the surrounding suburban counties of Westchester, Suffolk, and Nassau due to an increase in cases of avian influenza.
  - At the 30th Critics' Choice Awards comedy-drama film Anora wins Best Picture at the Critics' Choice Awards, while Jon M. Chu wins Best Director for musical film Wicked.
- February 8 – International Criminal Court Prosecutor Karim Ahmad Khan becomes the first person to have economic and travel sanctions placed on him by the US government following an executive order signed by Trump intended to target the war crimes tribunal over investigations of US citizens or US allies.
- February 9
  - In Super Bowl LIX, the Philadelphia Eagles beat the Kansas City Chiefs, 40–22, to win the Super Bowl, denying the Chiefs' bid for a three-peat.
  - Trump's authorized airstrike in Cal Miskaad mountains in Bari Region, Puntland, on February 1, is confirmed to have killed ISIS leader Ahmed Maeleminine, a key recruiter and financier for the militant group.
- February 10
  - Trump signs an executive order imposing a 25% tariff on all aluminium and steel imports.
  - Trump signs an executive order directing the Department of Justice to pause enforcing the Foreign Corrupt Practices Act of 1977, a law that prohibits American companies and foreign firms from bribing officials of foreign governments to obtain or retain business.
  - Louisiana Governor Jeff Landry announces that the state had finalized its new execution protocol, allowing executions to be carried out in Louisiana after 15 years (2010).
- February 11
  - National Security Adviser Mike Waltz announces that Russia has released Marc Fogel, an American teacher detained since 2021 after Steve Witkoff and several other Trump aides visited Moscow to negotiate an exchange for money launderer Alexander Vinnik.
  - King Abdullah II of Jordan meets Trump in Washington D.C. for talks focusing on the president's proposal for the removal of Palestinians from the Gaza Strip and a subsequent US takeover of the region, with Trump threatening to withhold aid from Jordan and Egypt if they do not agree to the proposal.
  - Australia, the United Kingdom, and the US announce sanctions on a Russian bulletproof hosting services provider that is allegedly ignoring law enforcement requests, along with two Russians who are operating the network.
  - Google Calendar confirms it has removed Black History Month, Pride Month and other cultural events from its service, saying the holidays were "not sustainable" for Google's new business model which is rolling back an emphasis on diversity, equity, and inclusion (DEI).
  - A hacktivist group called the "puppygirl hacker polycule" leaks over 8,000 privatized police manual and training documents obtained from Lexipol.
- February 12
  - After holding a telephone call with Russian President Vladimir Putin, Trump says negotiations to end the war in Ukraine will start immediately.
  - White House Press Secretary Karoline Leavitt announces that Belarus has released three detainees, including an American citizen.
- February 13
  - The Treasury Department sanctions Karim Ahmad Khan, the top prosecutor at the International Criminal Court, over his decision to investigate Israeli Prime Minister Benjamin Netanyahu and Defense Minister Yoav Gallant regarding their conduct during the Gaza war.
  - Robert F. Kennedy Jr. is confirmed as the Secretary of Health and Human Services.
  - Acting US Attorney for the Southern District of New York Danielle Sassoon and five other Justice Department officials resign after being ordered by the second Trump administration to drop a federal corruption case against New York City Mayor Eric Adams.
  - The Navy Sixth Fleet announces that the Nimitz-class aircraft carrier USS Harry S. Truman was involved in collision at sea with the merchant vessel Besiktas-M on Feb 12 while operating in the vicinity of Port Said, Egypt, in the Mediterranean Sea.
  - The Trump administration fires more than 300 of the 1,800 staff from the National Nuclear Security Administration – the agency tasked with safeguarding the nuclear stockpile of the US.
- February 15
  - Flash flooding impacts parts of the US, claiming at least three lives.
  - French President Emmanuel Macron announces an emergency summit known as Weimar+ in Paris, between European Union leaders following a controversial speech given by Vice President JD Vance at the Munich Security Conference in which he criticized European leadership as the worst threat to Europe, particularly for imposing too much censorship and too little control over migration.
  - Russian Foreign Minister Sergey Lavrov and Rubio speak by telephone about the Russo-Ukrainian War, the Gaza war, the sanctions against Russia, and removing restrictions on each country's diplomatic missions. They also discuss preparations for a high-level summit in Saudi Arabia. This is the first time the US and Russia have had contact at the foreign minister level in almost two years.
  - Hundreds of White South Africans hold a protest outside the US embassy in Pretoria in support of Trump's claims that the South African government is discriminating against the country's white minority.
- February 16
  - Rubio leads a delegation that includes National Security Advisor Michael Waltz and Special Envoy Steve Witkoff to Riyadh for initial talks with Russia. A Russian source reports that the meeting will occur on February 18 and that the Russian delegation is expected to include Foreign Minister Sergey Lavrov, Presidential Aide Yuri Ushakov, and SVR Director Sergey Naryshkin.
  - The US military announces that the Yemen Coast Guard had successfully intercepted an Iranian weapons shipment on its way to the Houthi movement in Yemen on February 12.
- February 17
  - 50501 demonstrations take place at state capitols around the US, including at Union Square in Washington, D.C. against the second administration of Trump, the Department of Government Efficiency, Elon Musk, and Project 2025.
  - Twenty-one people are injured, including three critically, when Delta Connection Flight 4819, a Mitsubishi Bombardier CRJ-900LR, crashes after catching fire and flipping over at Toronto Pearson International Airport in Canada en route from Minneapolis–Saint Paul International Airport.
  - February 2025 North American storm complex: Eight adults and one child are killed in flooding caused by heavy rains in the eastern US.
  - Southwest Airlines announces it will layoff 1,750 jobs, 15% of its corporate workforce, for cost reduction. This is the company's first mass layoff since it started operating in 1971.
- February 18
  - The US and Russia start talks in Saudi Arabia about the war in Ukraine without European or Ukrainian participation. The delegations agree to start the negotiating process for ending the war, create high-level teams, and normalize diplomatic and economic ties between the two countries.
  - Trump accuses Ukraine of starting the war and calls for a new presidential election to be held in Ukraine as part of a peace deal with Russia.
  - The Senate confirms businessman Howard Lutnick as the Secretary of Commerce in a 51–45 vote.
  - NASA's Center for Near-Earth Object Studies announces that the chance of asteroid 2024 YR4 impacting Earth on December 22, 2032, has increased to 3.1% (1-in-32) following further observations of its orbital trajectory. It has now surpassed the threat of 99942 Apophis, which once had a 2.7% chance of hitting Earth during 2004 before later being ruled out.
  - The National Science Foundation dismisses 168 workers, 10% of its workforce, to comply with Trump's executive order to reduce the federal workforce.
- February 19
  - Two light aircraft, a Lancair 360 MK II and a Cessna 172S, collide midair at Marana Regional Airport near Tucson, Arizona, killing 2 people.
  - The United Nations Security Council holds an emergency meeting in New York City in response to rapid territorial gains made by M23 rebels, with U.N. special envoy for Congo Bintou Keita saying the council needed to take "urgent and decisive steps to avert a wider regional war."
  - The Federal Aviation Administration lays off about 400 jobs, including positions in aviation safety, aircraft maintenance, and flight inspection.
- February 20
  - The Internal Revenue Service announces it will lay off over 6,000 jobs around Tax Day as part of department downsizing led by Elon Musk's Department of Government Efficiency.
  - Amidst heightened tensions between the two nations, the Canada men's ice hockey team defeats the US team 3–2 in overtime in the final of the 2025 4 Nations Face-Off at TD Garden in Boston, with Connor McDavid scoring the winning goal.
- February 21
  - The Pentagon and the Department of Defense announce they will jointly lay off 4,500 probationary workers, cutting 5 to 8% of the civilian workforce. The US Forest Service also announces it will lay off 2,000 employees.
  - Veolia Water agrees to pay $53 million in settlement for all remaining active class action lawsuits for the contamination of drinking water in Flint, Michigan, but refuses to acknowledge any fault in the crisis.
  - Trump and Secretary of Defense Pete Hegseth announce the removal of multiple senior US officers from their current roles, including the Chairman of the Joint Chiefs of Staff Charles Q. Brown Jr. and the Chief of Naval Operations Lisa Franchetti.
  - Hadi Matar is found guilty by a New York jury of attempted murder and assault for his stabbing attack on author Salman Rushdie in 2022.
  - Three people are killed in a shooting outside of a motor vehicle office in Louisville, Kentucky.
- February 22
  - Two people, including a police officer, are killed and seven other people are injured in a mass shooting at the UPMC Memorial Hospital in West Manchester Township, Pennsylvania.
  - One person is killed and another is injured in a shooting at the Kirtland Air Force Base in Albuquerque, New Mexico. The FBI is investigating the shooting, but it is believed the incident was not an act of terrorism.
  - Three people, including two police officers, are killed during a traffic stop in Virginia Beach, Virginia.
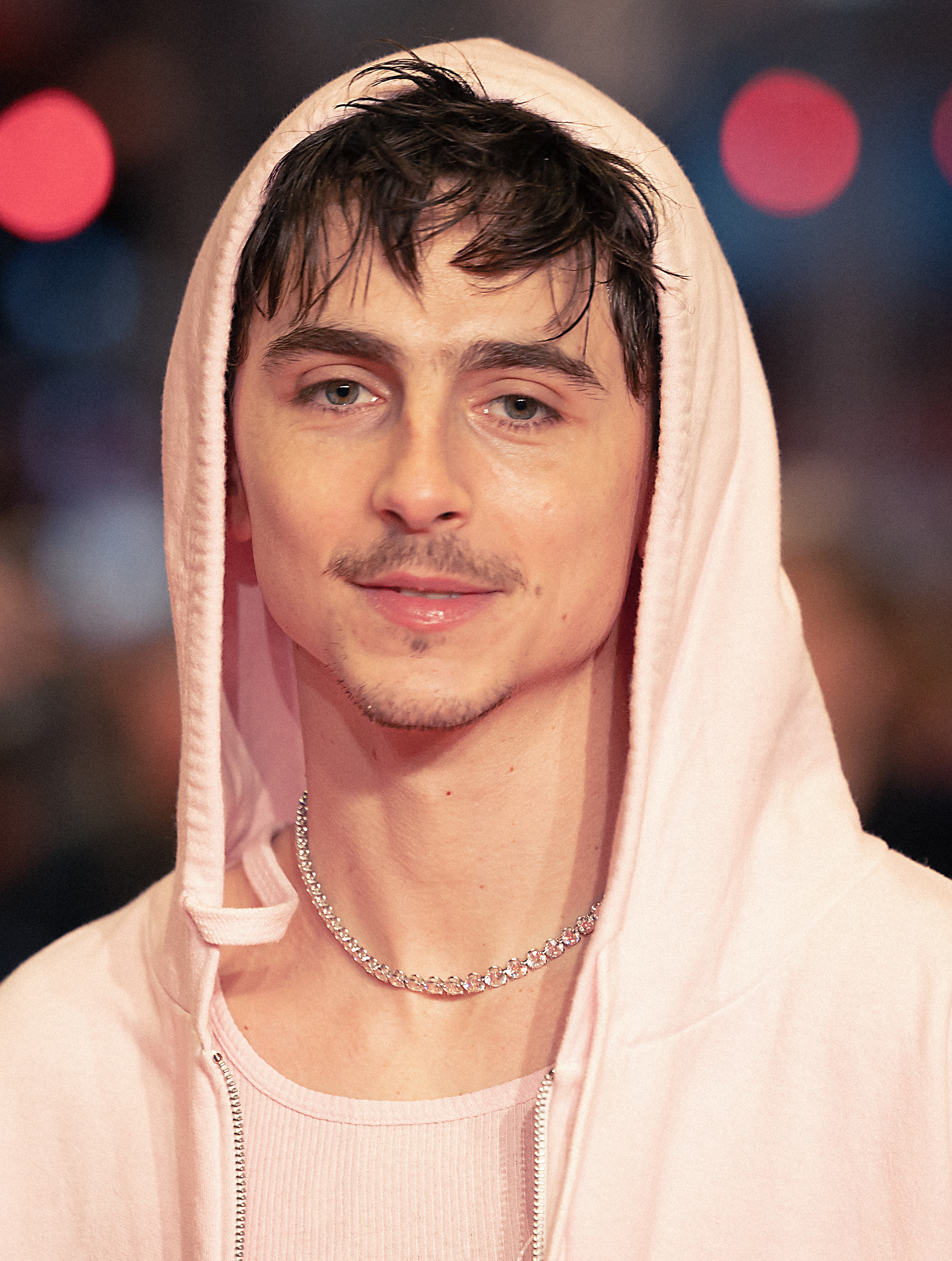
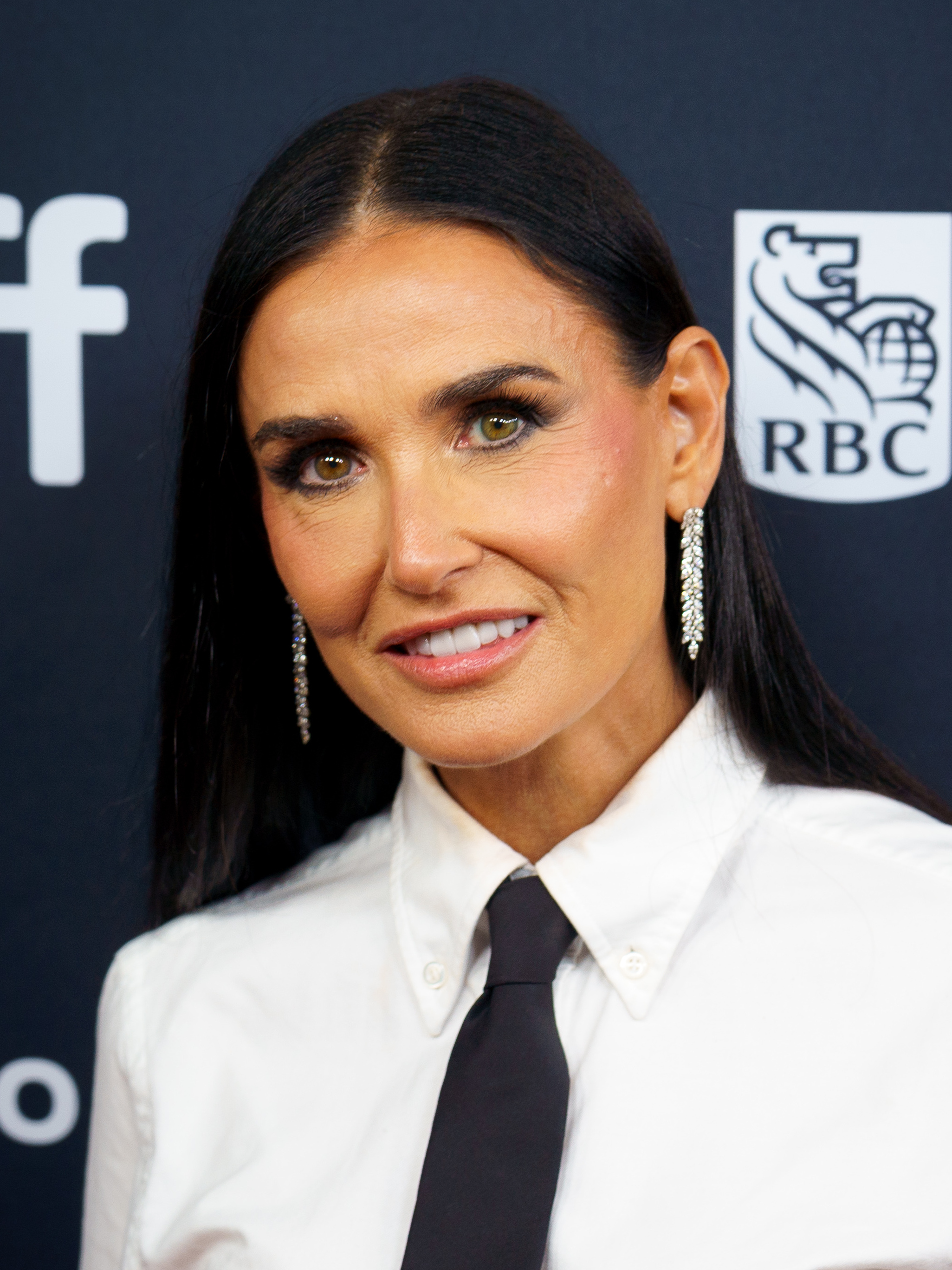
February 23: At the Screen Actors Guild Awards, Timothée Chalamet (left) wins the Outstanding Leading Male Performance for his role as Bob Dylan in A Complete Unknown, while Demi Moore (right) wins Outstanding Leading Female Performance for her role in The Substance.
- February 23
  - At the 31st Screen Actors Guild Awards, Timothée Chalamet wins Outstanding Leading Male Performance for his role as Bob Dylan in A Complete Unknown, while Demi Moore wins Outstanding Leading Female Performance for her role in The Substance. Political thriller film Conclave wins Outstanding Ensemble Performance in a Motion Picture.
  - American Airlines Flight 292, flying from New York, to New Delhi, is forced to divert to Rome Fiumicino Airport, due to an unspecified security concern later deemed to be non-credible. The flight was over the Caspian Sea near Turkmenistan when it diverted back towards Europe.
  - At least three IS–Somalia fighters are killed in a joint Puntland armed forces–US Africa Command airstrike targeting IS militants hiding in the Cal Miskaad mountains of the Bari Region of Puntland, Somalia.
- February 24
  - The United Nations General Assembly votes 93–18, with 65 abstentions, to pass a resolution condemning Russia's war against Ukraine. The 18 countries that voted against it includes the US, Russia, Belarus, and North Korea.
  - The Texas Department of State Health Services places several major cities in the state on high alert due to a measles outbreak spreading to 99 people in Texas and New Mexico, the third largest outbreak since it was considered eradicated in the US in 2000.
  - NASA formally announces that asteroid 2024 YR4 now poses "no significant threat" to Earth in 2032 and beyond as the chances of an impact drop to 1-in-59,000 (0.0017%). This means a planetary defense mission to intercept and deflect the object in 2028 during a close flyby of Earth is no longer necessary.
  - Apple announces a $500 billion investment plan in the US over the next five years, aiming to hire 20,000 new employees and manufacture AI servers.
  - Starbucks announces that it will cut 1,100 jobs across its stores in the US as part of cost reduction measures. The company also announces that its menu will be "simplified" and shrunk by 33%.
- February 25
  - Jo-Ann Stores files its second bankruptcy claim and announces it will close all 800 stores in the 49 states, with liquidation sales beginning immediately.
  - US District Judge for the Western Washington District Court Jamal Whitehead temporarily blocks Trump's executive order to suspend the Refugee Admissions Program, ruling that Trump cannot nullify the law passed by Congress, following a lawsuit against the Trump administration by the International Refugee Assistance Project.
- February 26
  - Trump announces impending 25% tariffs on the European Union, which he states will be generally applied to sectors such as the automotive industry.
  - Eli Lilly announces a $27 billion investment plan to open four new manufacturing sites and create 13,000 jobs in the US.
  - Trump cancels energy corporation Chevron's license to operate in Venezuela.
  - The Trump administration bans reporters from the Associated Press, Reuters, Der Tagesspiegel, and HuffPost from the White House over their refusal to refer to the Gulf of Mexico as the "Gulf of America".

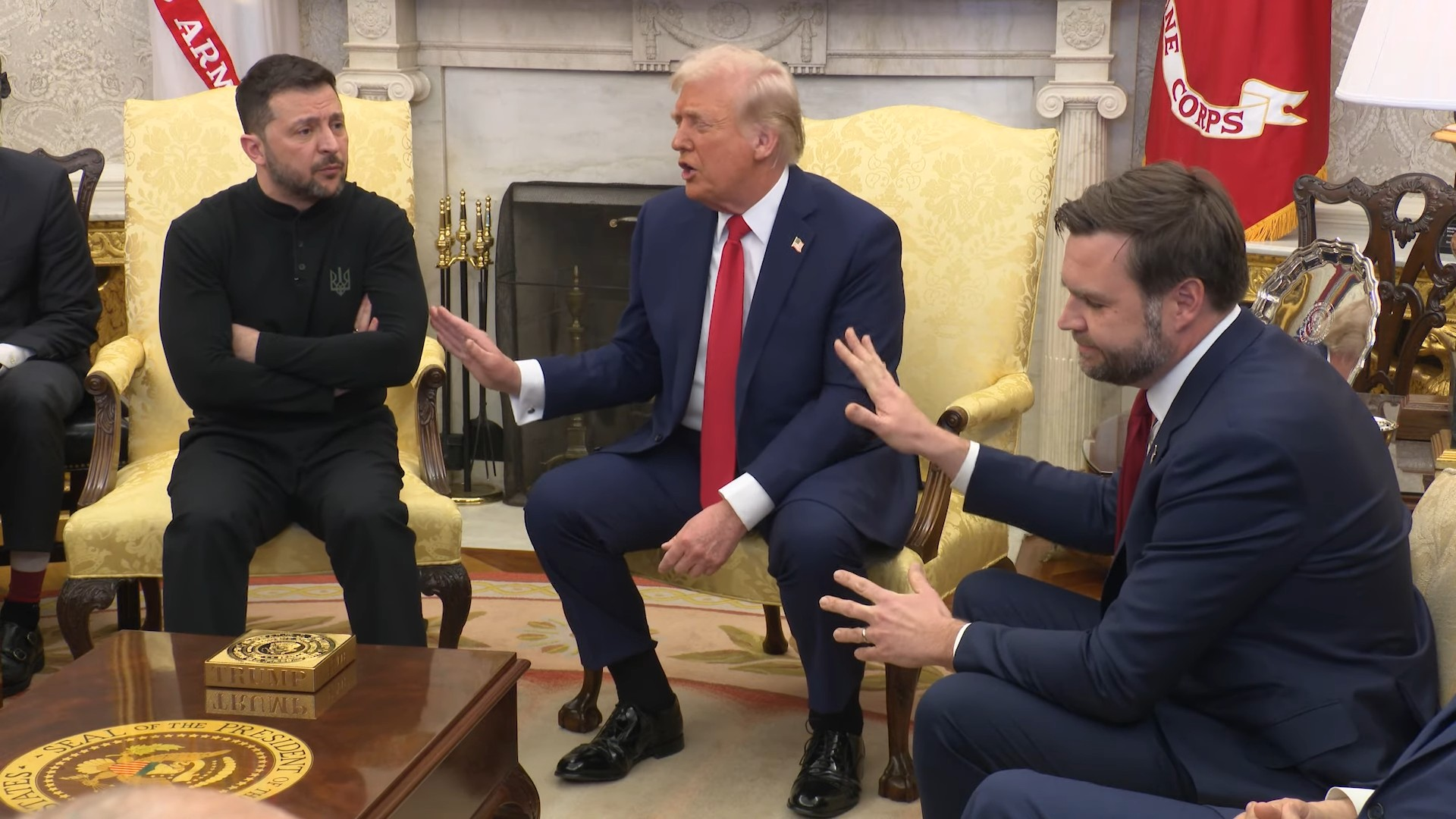
February 28: President Trump and VP Vance meets with Ukrainian President Zelenskyy at the White House, where they sharply criticize him.

- February 27
  - OpenAI announces GPT-4.5, its largest and most advanced AI model to date.
  - The Trump administration bans NASA scientists and US government officials from attending the United Nations Intergovernmental Panel on Climate Change conference that started this week in Hangzhou, China, which is focused on the seventh IPCC Assessment Report on climate change.
  - Trump meets with UK Prime Minister Keir Starmer in Washington, D.C., for talks that include the Russo-Ukrainian War peace negotiations. Starmer also presented a letter from King Charles III inviting Trump to visit London.
  - Meta Platforms says it has fixed an error that resulted in Instagram users' Reels feeds displaying violent and graphic videos despite these users having content filters enabled.
- February 28
  - A meeting between Trump and Ukrainian President Volodymyr Zelenskyy takes place at the White House. Trump and JD Vance sharply criticize Zelenskyy, raising questions about the support for Ukraine, the proposed end to the war, as well as the country's future in general.
  - A 24-hour consumer spending boycott takes place across the US, in protest of wealth and income inequality, high prices of essential goods, and the rollback of diversity, equity, and inclusion initiatives by the Trump administration.
  - The Social Security Administration announces it will lay off over 7,000 jobs to align with Trump's executive order, despite its workforce already being at a 50-year low.
  - Mexico extradites 29 alleged cartel members to the US, including Rafael Caro Quintero, Miguel Treviño Morales, Omar Treviño Morales, Vicente Carrillo Fuentes and Jose Rodolfo Villarreal-Hernandez.
  - Microsoft announces it will shut down Skype in May 2025 to focus its support and development on Teams.

=== March ===
- March 1
  - Trump signs an executive order which declares English as the country's official language.
  - US Central Command says that it has carried out a precision airstrike in Syria, targeting and killing Muhammed Yusuf Ziya Talay, a senior military leader in Hurras al-Din.
- March 2
  - The 97th Academy Awards are held at the Dolby Theatre in Los Angeles, honoring the best in films released in 2024. Anora wins the most awards, taking five, including Best Picture.
  - Several wildfires erupt across South Carolina and North Carolina, resulting in the evacuation of endangered towns, including several in the Myrtle Beach area. South Carolina governor Henry McMaster declares a state of emergency in response.
  - Secretary of Defense Pete Hegseth orders a halt to offensive cyber operations and information operations against Russia by US Cyber Command.
  - Firefly Aerospace successfully lands the Blue Ghost Mission 1 on the Moon as part of NASA's Commercial Lunar Payload Services program, delivering payloads to Mare Crisium with instruments to study lunar regoliths and the interactions between solar wind and Earth's magnetic field.
- March 3
  - TSMC announces plans to invest $100 billion in US chip manufacturing.
  - The US seeks a plan to ease sanctions on Russia and some Russian oligarchs, while pausing all current military aid to Ukraine.
  - Trump orders an expansion of tree-cutting across 280m acres (113m hectares) of national forests and other public lands.
- March 4
  - Trump's 25% tariffs on Mexican and Canadian imports to the US take effect, while an existing 10% tariff on all Chinese imports rises to 20% amid an ongoing trade war. Canadian Prime Minister Justin Trudeau says that he will impose a reciprocal 25% tariff on American goods worth up to $155 billion. The Chinese Ministry of Finance announces 10 to 15% tariffs on a range of American food imports, set to start March 10.
  - Trump delivers a speech to a joint session of Congress.
  - A storm complex leaves over 400,000 people without power in the Dallas–Fort Worth metroplex and brings severe weather to large portions of the Southern US.
  - Scientists from Colossal Biosciences create a new species of genetically modified woolly mice.
- March 5
  - CIA director John Ratcliffe announces that the US has suspended intelligence sharing with Ukraine.
  - The US begins direct negotiations with Hamas over the release of the remaining Israeli hostages. Trump later threatens on Truth Social and X that the people of Gaza "are dead" unless they return the hostages "immediately".
  - Trump announces a one-month temporary reprieve from tariffs for American automakers after receiving complaints from the Big Three: Ford, General Motors, and Stellantis.
  - The Department of Veterans Affairs announces it will lay off over 80,000 jobs to comply with the Trump administration's plans under the Department of Government Efficiency.
  - The Department of Defense denies previous media reports that Secretary of Defense Pete Hegseth had ordered a halt to offensive cyber operations and information operations against Russia by the US Cyber Command.
  - Los Angeles County files a lawsuit against Southern California Edison, the electric utility company servicing most of Southern California, and alleges that the company's power system started the Eaton Fire, seeking to recover costs and damages sustained from the fire that damaged over 9,400 buildings and killed 17 people.
  - The US Embassy in Mogadishu warns of imminent attack threats in Somalia, including at Aden Adde International Airport. At the same time, Somali military officials confirm that the Trump administration has halted all funding for Somalia's Danab Brigade special forces and cut billions in USAID grants to the country.
  - The US Attorney for the District Court of Vermont indicts and charges 25 Canadians for conspiracy to defraud elderly people in the US out of US$21 million and charges five of those 25 with conspiracy to commit money laundering.
  - Three skiers are killed after an avalanche trapped them under more than 30 feet of snow in the Chugach Mountains, Alaska
- March 6
  - Trump pauses tariffs on USMCA-compliant imports from Canada and Mexico until April 2.
  - CMA CGM announces a $20 billion investment in US logistics over the next four years, aiming to create 10,000 new jobs.
  - Trump signs an executive order creating a Strategic Bitcoin Reserve funded exclusively with bitcoin seized in criminal and civil forfeiture cases.
  - According to a report in the academic journal Science, the population of the 554 recorded species of butterflies in the US has declined by 22% since 2000.
  - The US withdraws from the Just Energy Transition Partnership, a program that helps emerging countries transition away from non-renewable energy sources like fossil fuels.
  - SpaceX launches its eighth test flight of the Starship launch vehicle from Starbase in Texas. The first stage is caught by the launch tower despite Raptor engine failures during landing, but the second stage fails during its burn, mirroring the last flight test in January.
  - Intuitive Machines' space probe IM-2 Athena lands on Mons Mouton near the lunar south pole after launching from Kennedy Space Center in Florida, on February 27.
- March 7
  - Organized demonstrations and walkouts of scientists take place across 30 cities in the US and France in protest of the Trump administration's grant budget and employment cuts to several government scientific agencies.
  - South Carolina executes Brad Sigmon by firing squad. This was the first execution by firing squad since 2010, when Ronnie Lee Gardner from Utah was executed by firing squad.
  - The US Army stationed in Puntland maintains its operations and will not pull out of the region in response to double ongoing operations in the fight against ISIS in Puntland's Bari Region.
  - 2025 US federal mass layoffs: The Native American Rights Fund, on behalf of five Indigenous American students and three tribes, the Cheyenne and Arapaho Tribes, the Prairie Band Potawatomi Nation, and the Pueblo of Isleta, file a lawsuit against the US Department of the Interior and the Bureau of Indian Education (BIE) for alleged wrongful dismissals of BIE schoolteachers.
- March 9
  - ICE arrests Mahmoud Khalil, a Palestinian student who played a prominent role during pro-Palestinian protests at Columbia University, and revokes his green card and student visa.
  - In football, Cleveland Browns defensive end Myles Garrett becomes the highest-paid non-quarterback in the National Football League after agreeing to a deal with the Browns that totals his salary at $40 million per year.
  - A man is shot by Secret Service agents near the White House.
  - A plane crashes in a residential area in Pennsylvania, injuring five people.

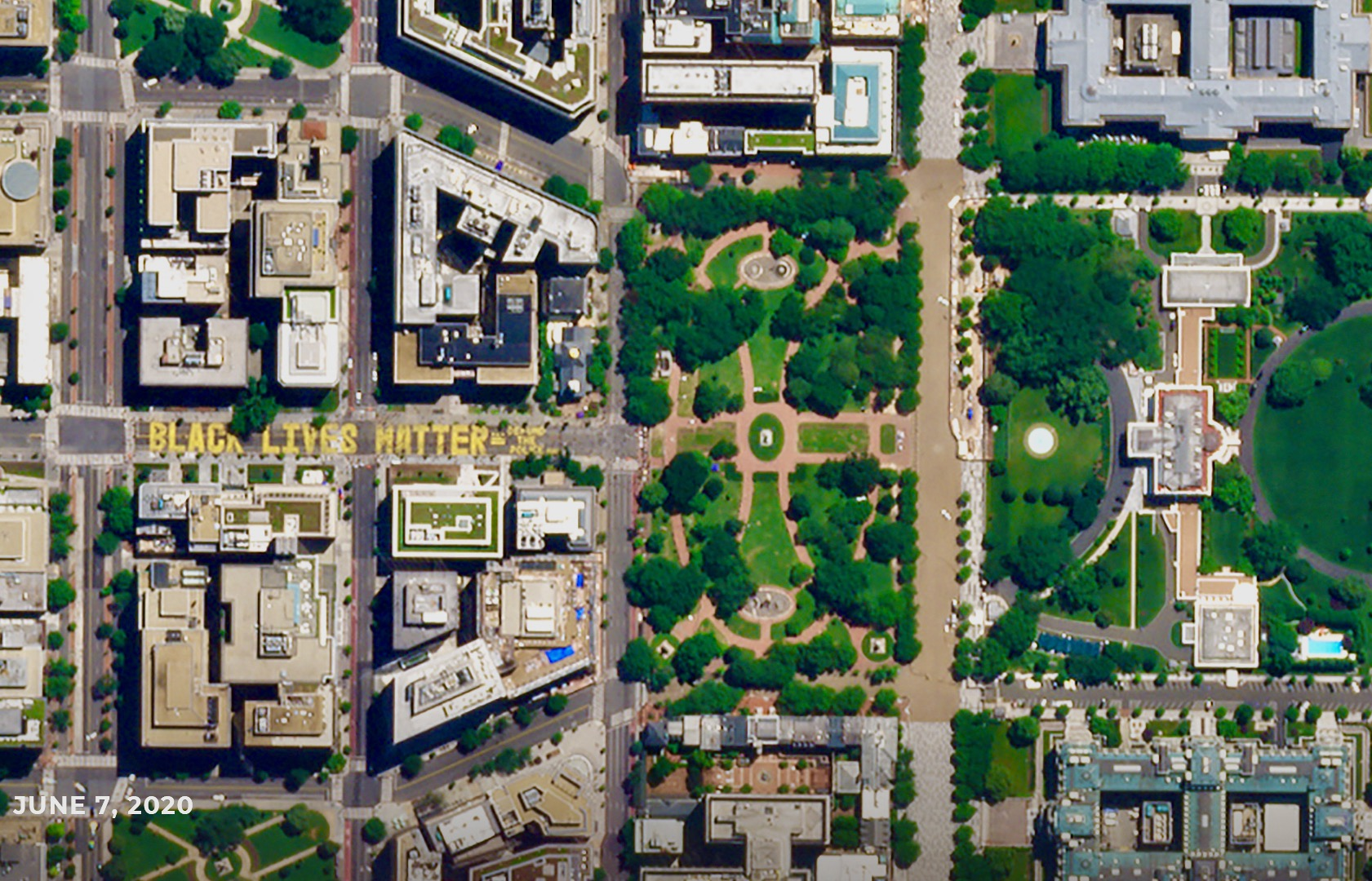
March 10: The Black Lives Matter mural (pictured) in Washington, D.C. is removed.

- March 10
  - A major sell-off occurs on the stock market, including a 4% drop on the Nasdaq, amid ongoing concern about the impact of tariffs on the US economy.
  - Ontario Premier Doug Ford announces that the province will charge 25% more for electricity supplied to the US, which includes the states of Michigan, Minnesota, and New York. It is suspended the next day.
  - X suffers from multiple global system outages, as owner Elon Musk claims that the site is being targeted in a "massive cyberattack".
  - Crews begin the removal of Black Lives Matter Plaza in Washington, D.C.
- March 11
  - Trump announces a doubling of tariffs on Canadian steel and aluminium, from 25% to 50%.
  - The US and Ukraine announce their intention to seek a 30-day ceasefire with Russia after talks in Jeddah, involving Secretary of State Marco Rubio, National Security Advisor Mike Waltz, and Ukrainian presidential chief of staff Andriy Yermak.
  - US District Judge for the District Court of the District of Columbia Amir Ali orders the Trump administration to pay nearly $2 billion in unpaid funds for promised USAID programs that the administration ended.
  - NASA launches the SPHEREx near-infrared space observatory on a Falcon 9 Block 5 spacecraft from Vandenberg Space Force Base in Santa Barbara County, California. The SPHEREx mission will perform a survey of and map approximately 450 million galaxies across the sky in color.
- March 12
  - A 25% tariff on aluminum and steel products imposed globally by the US comes into effect. In response, Canadian finance minister Dominic LeBlanc announces retaliatory tariffs on CAD$29.8 billion (US$20.7 billion) of goods from the US.
  - Iranian supreme leader Ali Khamenei rejects negotiations with the US regarding Iran's nuclear program, stating that Iran is "not interested in nuclear weapons".
  - Idaho governor Brad Little signs a bill, which officially makes firing squad as the primary execution method in the state. Idaho became the first state with such a policy.
- March 13
  - Russian President Vladimir Putin says that the American proposal for the ceasefire in Ukraine would depend on Russia's conditions being met, and that there will be further discussions.
  - The Trump administration reportedly orders the US military to plan options to expand the presence of American troops in Panama and potentially try to reclaim the Panama Canal.
  - During an Oval Office meeting with Secretary General of NATO Mark Rutte, Trump refuses to rule out the US' possible annexation of Greenland saying "I think that it will happen".
  - William Alsup of the US District Court for the Northern District of California orders the Department of Defense, Department of Veterans Affairs, Department of Agriculture, Department of Energy, Department of Interior, and the Treasury Department to reinstate workers who were fired by Trump.
- March 14
  - Severe winds and dry conditions in the states of Oklahoma and Texas cause a series of wildfires, forcing evacuations and leaving thousands without power.
  - 13 people are killed by tornadoes as a regional risk for an outbreak of severe weather is outlined by the Storm Prediction Center over much of the US. A rare high-risk convective outlook is issued for tomorrow over the Deep South.
  - Hamas says that it has agreed to resume ceasefire talks and release American Israeli hostage Edan Alexander. This comes after a proposal from Middle East envoy Steve Witkoff.
  - Iraq announces that the deputy head of the Islamic State in Iraq and Syria, Abdallah Maki Mosleh al-Rifai, was killed in the Al Anbar Governorate during a joint operation between Iraqi security forces and the US.
  - Secretary of State Marco Rubio declares South African Ambassador Ebrahim Rasool persona non grata for his criticism of Trump's 2024 presidential campaign.
  - Trump publicly asks Russian President Vladimir Putin to spare the lives of "thousands of Ukrainian soldiers" said to be surrounded in Kursk Oblast.
  - A total lunar eclipse occurs in the morning hours across the Western Hemisphere at night.
- March 15
  - Trump orders a series of airstrikes on Houthi-controlled areas in Yemen, killing at least 31 people and wounding 101 more. US Central Command announces that the strikes are the beginning of a large-scale operation in Yemen. The USS Harry S. Truman is targeted the next day by the Houthis with 18 rockets and drones.
  - Secretary of State Marco Rubio announces visa restrictions against former and current Thai officials who were involved in deporting at least 40 Uyghur men who were seeking asylum back to China, despite concerns that they could face persecution.
  - Trump signs an executive order to end federal funding of the news organization Voice of America, accusing it of being "anti-Trump" and "radical". Its entire staff of 1,300 people is put on paid leave.
  - The Trump administration flies 260 alleged immigrants to El Salvador, in defiance of a temporary restraining order from District Judge James Boasberg.
- March 16
  - The Trump administration says it has deported more than 200 alleged members of Tren de Aragua and MS-13 to El Salvador, citing the Alien Enemies Act. El Salvador's President Nayib Bukele says they will be transferred to the Terrorism Confinement Center.
  - Trump signs an executive order shutting down multiple state-funded broadcasters, including Voice of America, Radio y Televisión Martí and Alhurra, and ceasing grants to Radio Free Europe/Radio Liberty and Radio Free Asia.
- March 17
  - March–May 2025 United States attacks in Yemen: The US launches airstrikes on targets in Al Hudaydah and the Al Jawf Governorate. Tens of thousands of people attend a rally against the American attacks on Yemen in the capital city Sanaa.
  - Trump terminates Secret Service protection for Hunter and Ashley Biden.
- March 18
  - The records related to the assassination of John F. Kennedy that were previously withheld are released due to Trump's executive order to declassify and release them.
  - Convicted rapist-murderer Jessie Hoffman Jr. becomes the first inmate executed in Louisiana in 15 years since 2010, and also becomes the first inmate executed by nitrogen hypoxia in Louisiana.
  - Trump and Russian President Vladimir Putin agree to an immediate energy infrastructure ceasefire in Ukraine during a phone call, with additional negotiations to begin immediately on a permanent settlement of the conflict. Putin stated that the end of all foreign military and intelligence support to Ukraine would be one condition of such a settlement.
  - NASA astronauts and Crew-9 members Butch Wilmore and Suni Williams arrive back on Earth, after nine months aboard the International Space Station.
- March 19
  - A jury in North Dakota finds that Greenpeace must pay hundreds of millions of dollars to pipeline company Energy Transfer and is liable for defamation and other claims over protests in the state nearly a decade previously.
  - SoftBank Group announces it will acquire Ampere Computing for $6.5 billion.
  - US government sources reveal that Trump's letter to Iranian Supreme Leader Ali Khamenei from two weeks ago contained a deadline of two months for reaching a new deal on Iran's nuclear program.
- March 20
  - US District Judge for the District of Maryland Ellen Lipton Hollander temporarily blocks the Department of Government Efficiency from accessing Social Security systems that cover the personal information of US citizens. Judge Hollander also orders the department to delete any previously accessed personally identifiable information in their possession.
  - Trump signs an executive order to begin the process of eliminating the Department of Education.
  - Electric vehicle maker Tesla recalls nearly all of its Cybertruck models across the US, over a safety issue involving an exterior panel.
- March 21
  - Johnson & Johnson announces plans to invest over $55 billion in building four new plants in the US within the next four years.
  - Boeing is awarded a contract worth over $20 billion to build the US Air Force's Air superiority sixth-generation fighter jet, named the F-47.
  - Three people are killed and 15 others are injured in a mass shooting in a parking lot during a large gathering at Young Park in Las Cruces, New Mexico.
- March 22 – The US lifts a $10 million reward for information leading to the arrest of Afghan warlord Sirajuddin Haqqani after the Taliban released an American citizen who had been kept in captivity for two years.
- March 23
  - National Security Advisor Mike Waltz says that the US wants the "full dismantlement" of Iran's nuclear program and that "all options are on the table".
  - DNA testing firm 23andMe files for bankruptcy.
  - In tennis, Alexandra Eala becomes the first Filipino player to defeat a top-10 opponent since the WTA rankings began in 1975, after winning in the third round of the Women's singles tournament at the Miami Open against world No. 5 Madison Keys.
  - In soccer, Mexico wins its first Nations League title after defeating Panama 2–1 in the final held at SoFi Stadium in Inglewood, California.

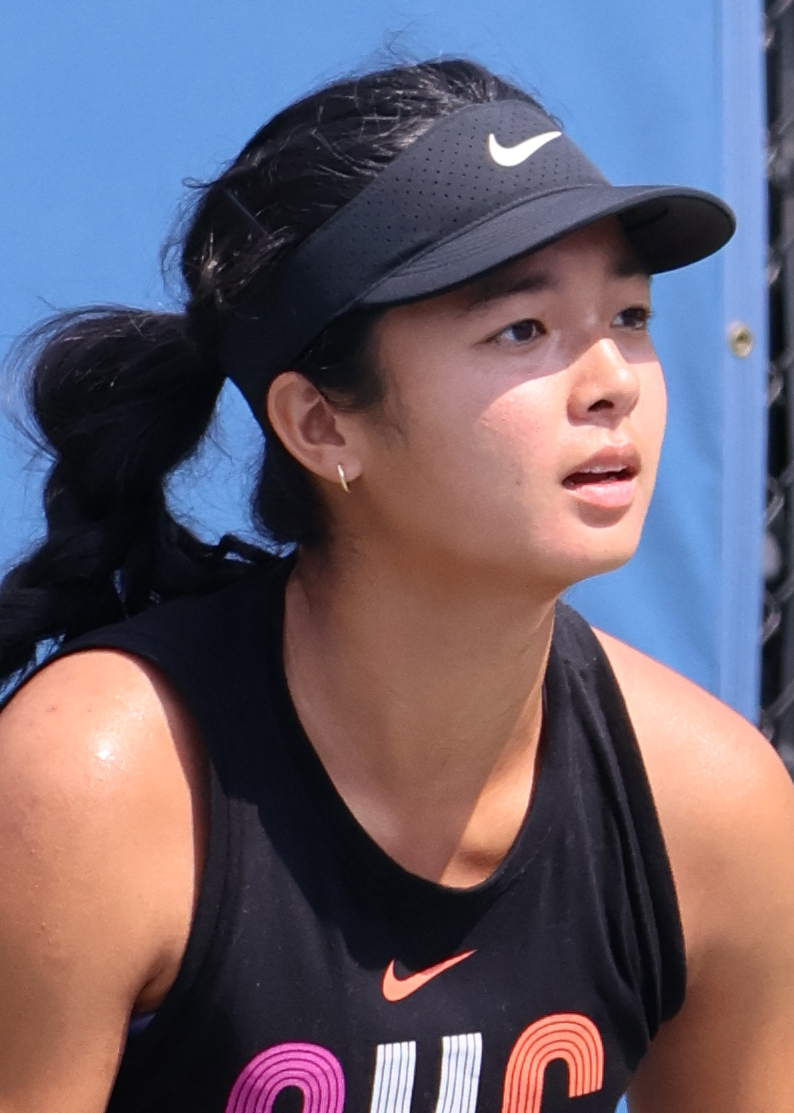
March 23: Alexandra Eala becomes the first Filipino player to defeat a top-10 opponent since the WTA rankings began in 1975, after she won in the third round of the Miami Open.

- March 24
  - Editor-in-chief of The Atlantic, Jeffrey Goldberg, reveals that members of Trump's cabinet inadvertently shared Yemen strike plans with him in a Signal group chat.
  - Hyundai Motor Group announces a $21 billion investment in the US, including a $5.8 billion new steel plant in Louisiana.
  - Greenlandic prime minister Múte Bourup Egede says a planned visit to the island by senior American officials, including National Security Advisor Michael Waltz and Second Lady Usha Vance, is "highly aggressive" and was designed to "demonstrate power over us".
- March 25
  - The United States Congress holds the fourth and last investigative hearing regarding the actions of Federal Emergency Management Agency (FEMA) during Hurricane Helene and Hurricane Milton in 2024, which sparked widespread misinformation and political turmoil in the United States.
  - The US says that Russia and Ukraine agree to cease all military attacks in the Black Sea to ensure safe passage for commercial shipping, while Russia says that it needs guarantees and an order from the U.S. to Ukraine to respect such a deal.
- March 26
  - Trump signs 25% tariffs on all cars imported to the US. Canada states that it will respond, while Japan asks to be exempt from the tariffs.
  - The US military conducts airstrikes targeting ISIS militants in the Golis Mountains as part of a coordinated operation led by AFRICOM. The strikes reportedly kill militants without causing any civilian casualties in militant hideouts located in the Golis Mountains of Puntland's Bari Region.
  - Four American soldiers go missing during training in the Pabradė Training Area in Lithuania. The soldiers are later found in an armored vehicle in a deep swamp.
- March 27
  - The US suspends financial contributions to the World Trade Organization.
  - Henrry Josue Villatoro Santos, a top MS-13 gang leader, is arrested in Northern Virginia.
  - Idaho governor Brad Little formally signs a bill into law that permits the death penalty for rape and sexual abuse of children younger than 12 years of age. The bill will become effective on July 1, 2025. This law could ultimately challenge the precedent of Kennedy v. Louisiana.
- March 28
  - Vice President JD Vance and several other senior Trump administration officials visit the Pituffik Space Base, a US Space Force facility in Greenland.
  - At least seven people are injured by US military airstrikes in the Yemeni capital city Sanaa.
  - Utah becomes the first US state to ban LGBTQ pride flags in government buildings and schools.
- March 29
  - Protests are held at Tesla dealerships across the US, Canada, and Europe to protest against DOGE chief and Tesla CEO Elon Musk's role in the second Trump administration.
  - A SOCATA TBM-700 crashes into an unoccupied house in Brooklyn Park, Minnesota, killing everyone on board.
  - March–May 2025 United States attacks in Yemen: US military airstrikes kill 1 person and injure 4 in the Saada Governorate, Yemen.
- March 30 – A bus driver shoots and kills two passengers on a Miami-Dade Transit bus in Miami Gardens, Florida.
- March 31
  - 2025 MLB season: The Athletics begin their temporary relocation to West Sacramento, California, which is planned to last until 2028, as part of their ongoing relocation to Las Vegas.
  - Senator Cory Booker of New Jersey gives a 25 hour speech criticizing Trump's policies. His marathon speech surpasses Strom Thurmond's record filibuster in length, making it the longest speech delivered on the Senate floor.
  - The US announces sanctions on six Chinese and Hong Kong officials, including head of the national security office Dong Jingwei, accusing them of "transnational oppression and undermining Hong Kong autonomy".

=== April ===
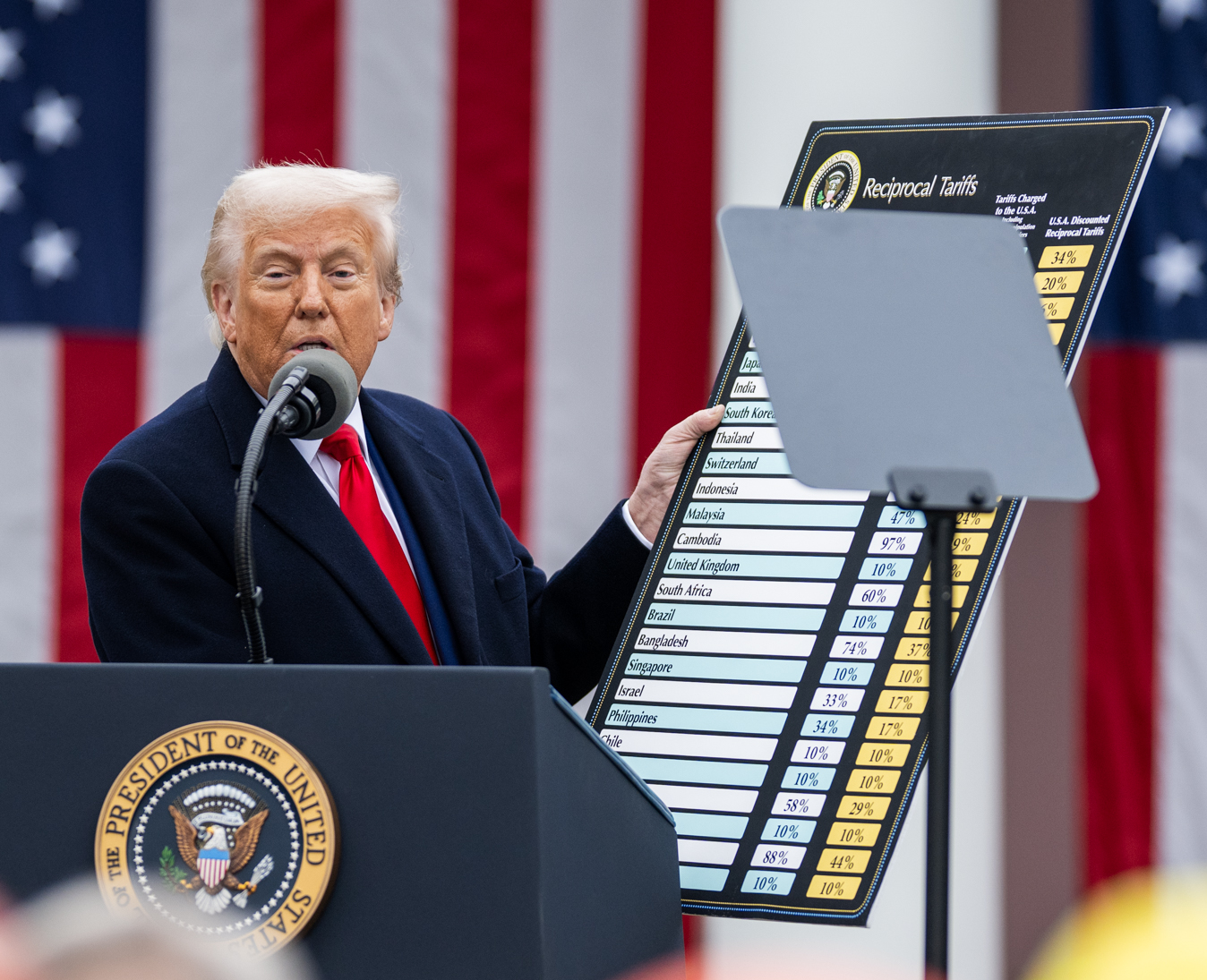
April 2: Trump announces a raft of worldwide tariffs.

Though Trump claimed in early December 2025—before November numbers were released—that "inflation has stopped", the consumer price index (CPI) began increasing in the months following his April 2025 announcement of tariffs.

Though Trump on December 9, 2025 rated his economy as "A+++++", the unemployment rate had increased during his second term.

Upon imposing the highest U.S. tariffs since the Great Depression (called "Liberation Day" in April 2025), Trump claimed that "jobs and factories will come roaring back". However, manufacturing employment declined every month for the rest of the year.

Consumer sentiment declined during the early part of Trump's second term. The University of Michigan Index of Consumer Sentiment reached a record low in April 2026.

Trump asserted tariffs on Chinese goods in February and April 2025, igniting a trade war that injected uncertainty as China turned to other sources.

In January 2026, the US dollar reached its lowest point in four years. A lower dollar makes US goods less expensive abroad, but it also makes foreign products more expensive in the US and thus tends to increase inflation.

- April 2
  - Trump announces the Liberation Day tariffs, which include a 10% baseline tariff for all imports.
  - The Senate votes 51–48 on a non-binding resolution to rebuke and reverse tariffs on Canada, with Republicans Rand Paul, Susan Collins, Lisa Murkowski, and Mitch McConnell voting for the resolution.
- April 3
  - Stock markets around the world fall sharply in response to the Trump tariffs. The Dow Jones Industrial Average falls by 3.2%, the S&P 500 index falls by over 4%, while the tech-focused Nasdaq is down 5.2%.
  - The US is given hosting rights to the 2031 FIFA Women's World Cup, with possible other CONCACAF members set to join as co-hosts. This is the third edition of the tournament that the US has hosted.
  - Timothy Haugh, head of both the National Security Agency and US Cyber Command, is fired by the Trump administration.
- April 4
  - Rent control in the US: Texas-based property management software company RealPage files a lawsuit against the city of Berkeley, California, as the city attempts to enact a local ordinance that would block landlords from deciding rent prices using an algorithm, alleging that the practice is anti-competitive and is driving up rent prices.
  - Stocks fall sharply for a second consecutive day, both in the US and globally. The Dow Jones ends the day 2,231 points (5.5%) lower. The S&P 500 closes the week down 9.1%, marking its worst performance since March 2020. Federal Reserve chairman Jerome Powell warns of "a highly uncertain outlook".
- April 5 – Hands Off protests: Mass protests are held in cities across the US in opposition to Trump and Elon Musk.

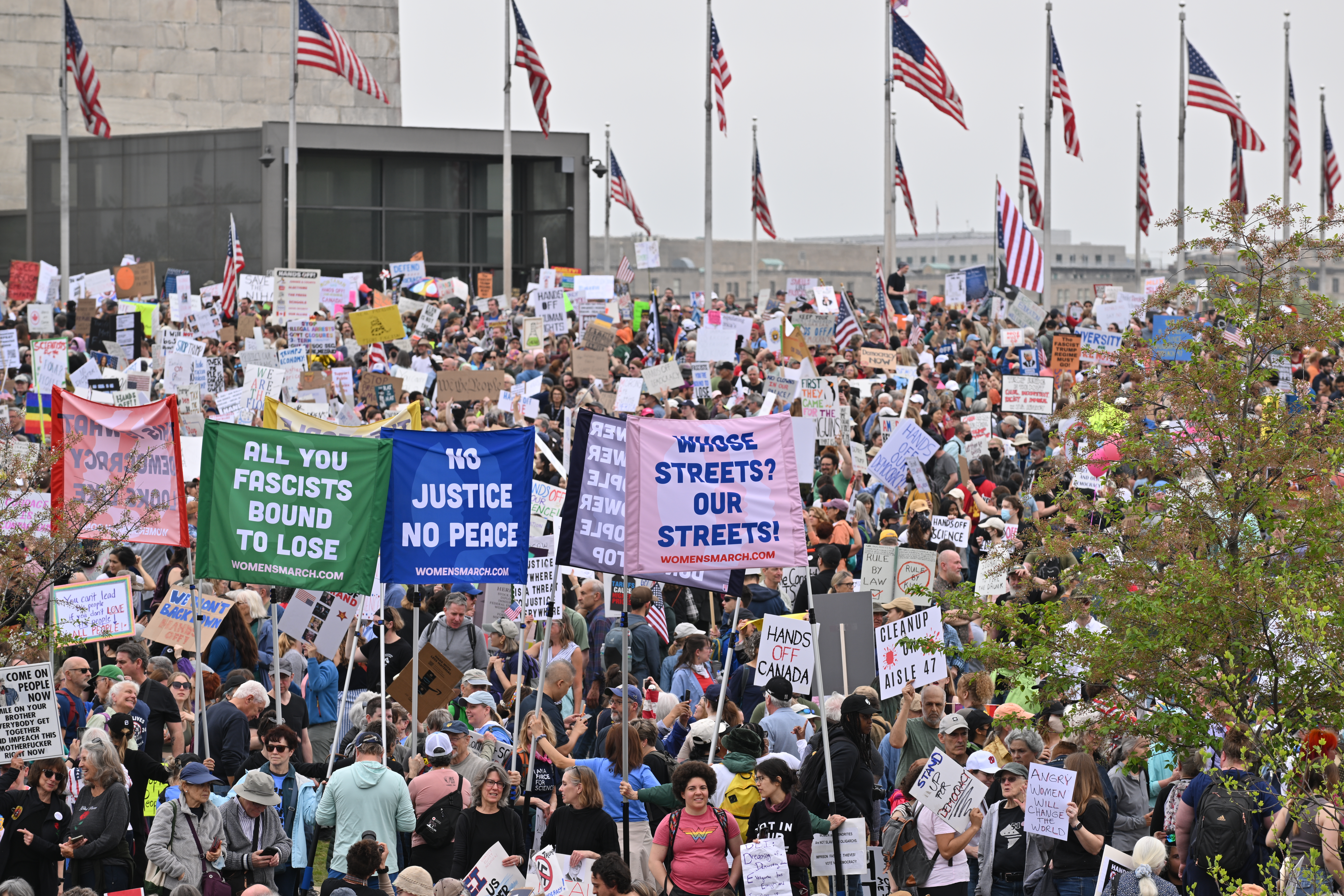
April 5: Mass protests are held across the country against President Trump and Elon Musk.

- April 6
  - 2025 Southwest US measles outbreak: A child dies from measles complications at the UMC Health System in Lubbock, Texas, US, becoming the third measles-related death amid outbreaks and the second unvaccinated child victim.
  - The death toll from the severe weather in the US rises to 18.
  - In ice hockey, Washington Capitals forward Alexander Ovechkin scores his 895th career goal, surpassing the all-time goals record held by Wayne Gretzky, during a matchup against the New York Islanders at UBS Arena in Elmont, New York.
- April 7 – In college basketball, the Florida Gators rally from a 12-point deficit to defeat the Houston Cougars, 65–63, at the Alamodome in San Antonio, Texas, to win their first championship since 2007.
- April 8 – Trump signs an executive order directing the federal government to start using "beautiful, clean coal" to power AI data centers.
- April 9
  - The Trump administration halts over $1 billion of funding from Cornell University and about $790 million from Northwestern University over alleged "civil rights violations".
  - Trump increases tariffs on China to 125% but pauses all new tariffs on every other country for 90 days with a lower reciprocal tariff of 10% during this period.
  - The Nasdaq Composite closes up 12.16%, its biggest one-day percentage gain since January 3, 2001, and the second-largest on record. The S&P 500 jumps 9.52%, its largest one-day gain since October 28, 2008. The Dow Jones closes with its largest daily net gain in history.
  - Secretary of the Army Daniel P. Driscoll replaces FBI director Kash Patel as the acting director of the Bureau of Alcohol, Tobacco, Firearms and Explosives.
- April 10
  - Novartis announces plans to invest $23 billion in building new plants in the US.
  - A Bell 206 sightseeing helicopter crashes into the Hudson River off Lower Manhattan, New York, killing all six people on board, including the Spanish Agustín Escobar family of five and the pilot.
  - The Supreme Court, in a unanimous decision, rules that the Trump administration must "facilitate" the return of wrongfully deported Maryland father Kilmar Abrego Garcia, imprisoned in an El Salvador jail.
- April 13–15 – The Rockbridge Network holds their spring summit in Florida.
- April 13
  - 2025 Pennsylvania Governor's Residence arson: A man is arrested after he allegedly broke into Pennsylvania Governor Josh Shapiro's residence and started a fire while Shapiro and his family were sleeping. 38-year-old Cody Balmer is held on charges of attempted murder, aggravated arson, terrorism, and other charges in connection with the fire.
  - A shooting at 5th Avenue Park in Conway, Arkansas results in 2 deaths and 9 injuries.
  - A gunman opens fire on a large crowd leaving the French Quarter Festival in New Orleans; 5 people are injured.
- April 14
  - Nvidia announces plans to produce up to $500 billion worth of AI infrastructure in the US over the next four years. The plan includes new production facilities in Texas, in collaboration with TSMC, Foxconn, Wistron, Amkor, and SPIL.
  - Trump meets with El Salvador's President Bukele at the White House. They both deny that Kilmar Abrego Garcia will be returned to the US.
  - A 5.2 magnitude earthquake strikes Julian, California, south of the Elsinore Fault Zone. The quake is felt in most of Southern California.
  - Anonymous web forum 4chan goes down as a result of a long-term hacking operation.
- April 15
  - 2025 US federal government grant pause: The Trump administration drafts a memorandum to Congress outlining a plan to halt all funding to public media programs, including PBS and NPR.
  - The federal government announces the freezing of more than $2.2 billion in grants and $60 million in contracts to Harvard University, after the institution said it would defy the Trump administration's demands to limit activism on campus.
  - Four people are injured in a mass shooting event at Wilmer-Hutchins High School in Dallas, Texas.
- April 16
  - California Governor Gavin Newsom and Attorney General Rob Bonta file a lawsuit against the Trump administration over his tariffs, making California the first U.S. state to do so.
  - A massive power outage causes the entire island of Puerto Rico to lose electricity.
- April 17
  - 2025 Florida State University shooting: At least two people are killed and six others are hospitalized in a mass shooting at Florida State University in Tallahassee, Florida, US. The suspect is arrested by local police.
  - Deportation of Kilmar Abrego Garcia: Democratic senator Chris Van Hollen from Maryland meets with Kilmar Abrego Garcia in El Salvador to push for his release. The move comes hours after being previously denied a meeting with him.
- April 18 – At least three people are killed when a small plane crashes into the Platte River in Omaha, Nebraska.
- April 19
  - Four people are killed when a Cessna 180 Skywagon aircraft clips powerlines and crashes into a field southwest of Coles County Memorial Airport in Trilla, Illinois.
  - Two people are killed and three others are rescued after two vehicles are swept off a road during flooding in southeast Moore, Oklahoma.
  - 2025 Tesla vandalism: The Department of Justice charges a student at the University of Massachusetts in Boston, Massachusetts, with unlawful possession of a destructive device and malicious damage by fire after the student is arrested for setting fire to two Tesla Cybertrucks and damaging charging stations in Kansas City, Missouri.
  - Federal authorities arrest a man in Colorado Springs for his "Declaration of War" threatening Elon Musk, Tesla owners, and members of Trump's cabinet. The declaration, sent to various media outlets, detailed specific attack methods and aimed at Musk's elimination.
- April 20 – Three people are killed and ten others are injured, including one critically and four firefighters, in a large house fire in Jamaica Estates, Queens, New York.
- April 21
  - President and Fellows of Harvard College v. Department of Health and Human Services: Harvard University files a lawsuit against the Trump administration over the administration's move to cut $2.3 billion in funding in contracts and grants to the university after accusing the school of alleged "civil rights violations".
  - 2025 Boston Marathon: Kenyan athletes John Korir and Sharon Lokedi win; Lokedi sets a women's course record of 2:17:22.
- April 22 – Roche announces plans to invest $50 billion in the US over the next five years, creating 12,000 jobs.
- April 23 – Harvey Weinstein's rape retrial begins after the original verdict was overturned.
- April 24
  - A group of 12 states files a lawsuit against the Trump administration, alleging that the national trade policy is subject to Trump's political motives instead of the law.
  - 2025 NFL draft: The NFL draft is held at Lambeau Field in Green Bay, Wisconsin, with the Tennessee Titans selected quarterback Cam Ward from the Miami Hurricanes as the first overall pick.
- April 25 – US Attorney for the District Court of Connecticut sentences former Congressman George Santos to a maximum sentence of 87 months in federal prison for several charges of wire fraud and identity theft, and orders Santos to pay nearly $374,000 in restitution.

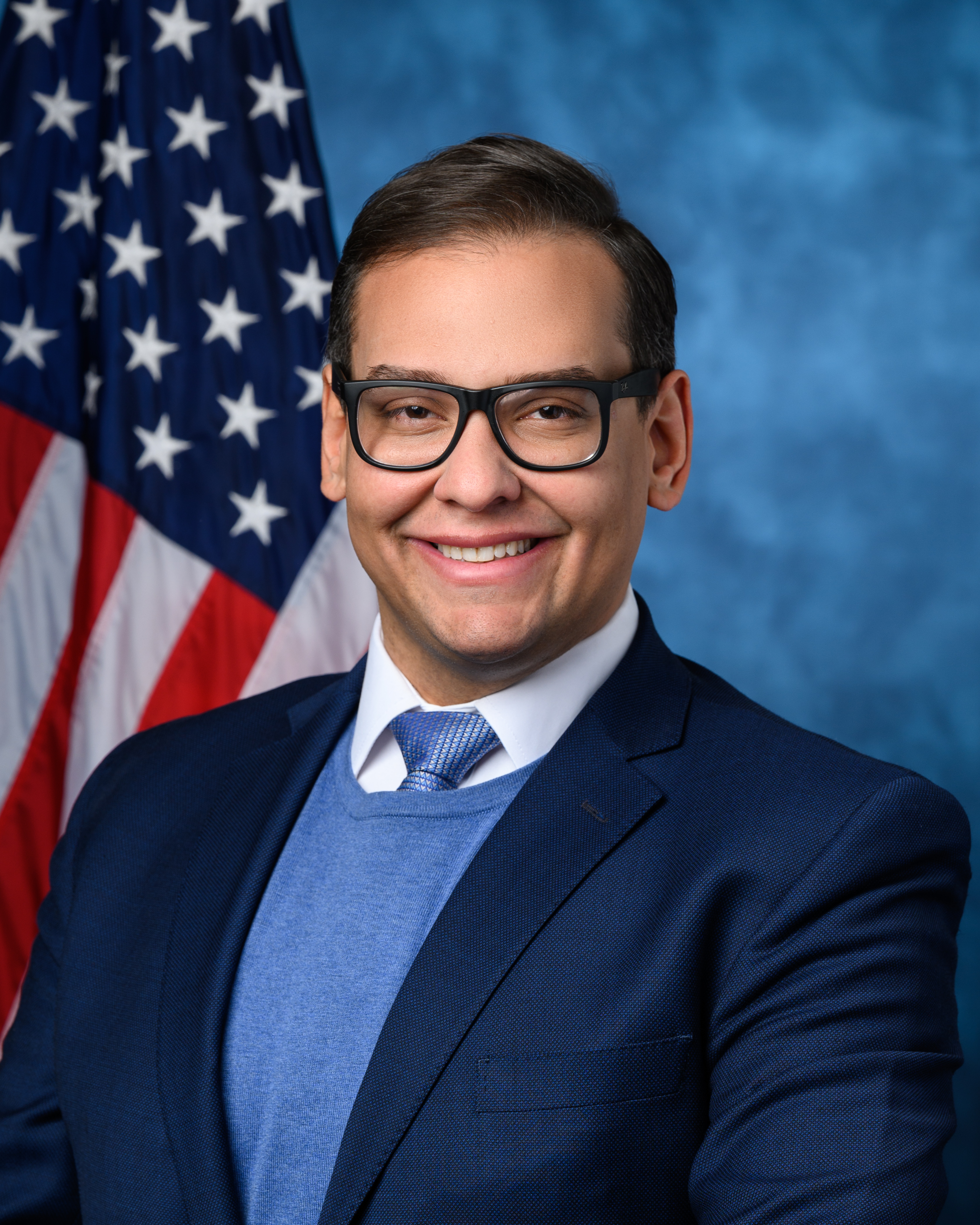
April 25: Former Congressman George Santos is sentenced to prison for wire fraud and identity theft and is fined nearly $374,000.

- April 26
  - Eleven people are injured in a shooting during an altercation in Myrtle Beach, South Carolina. The suspect is shot and killed by responding police officers.
  - The White House Correspondents' Association holds their annual dinner at the Washington Hilton.
  - The Executive Branch club holds their launch party.
- April 27
  - More than 100 people suspected of entering the U.S. illegally are detained in a raid by the DEA and ICE at a nightclub in Colorado Springs, Colorado, which had been investigated for drug trafficking and prostitution.
  - One person is killed and six others, including three students, are wounded in a school shooting during a university event at the historically black Elizabeth City State University in Elizabeth City, North Carolina.
- April 28
  - IBM announces a $150 billion investment in US manufacturing and research over the next five years.
  - The Air Force launches airstrikes on a migrant detention center in the city of Saada, Yemen killing at least 68 detained African migrants.
- April 30
  - The Ukraine–US Mineral Resources Agreement is signed, providing an economic incentive for the US to continue to invest in Ukraine's defence and reconstruction, in exchange for access to the war-torn country's energy and mineral resources.

=== May ===
- May 1
  - The House of Representatives cites the Congressional Review Act and votes to block California from implementing a law that would phase out the sale of new gas vehicles by 2035.
  - Trump issues an executive order for the Corporation for Public Broadcasting to cease funding for public broadcasting services such as the National Public Radio and the Public Broadcasting Service.
  - The American Civil Liberties Union files a lawsuit against the Federal Bureau of Prisons alleging that it systematically failed to provide adequate medical, mental health, and dental care for people imprisoned in Alaska.
  - Trump moves National Security Adviser Mike Waltz to be ambassador to the United Nations.
- May 3 – The 151st edition of the Kentucky Derby is held, with Sovereignty winning it.
- May 8 – American Robert Francis Prevost is elected pope during the 2025 conclave, becoming the first North American to hold the position. He chooses the name Leo XIV.

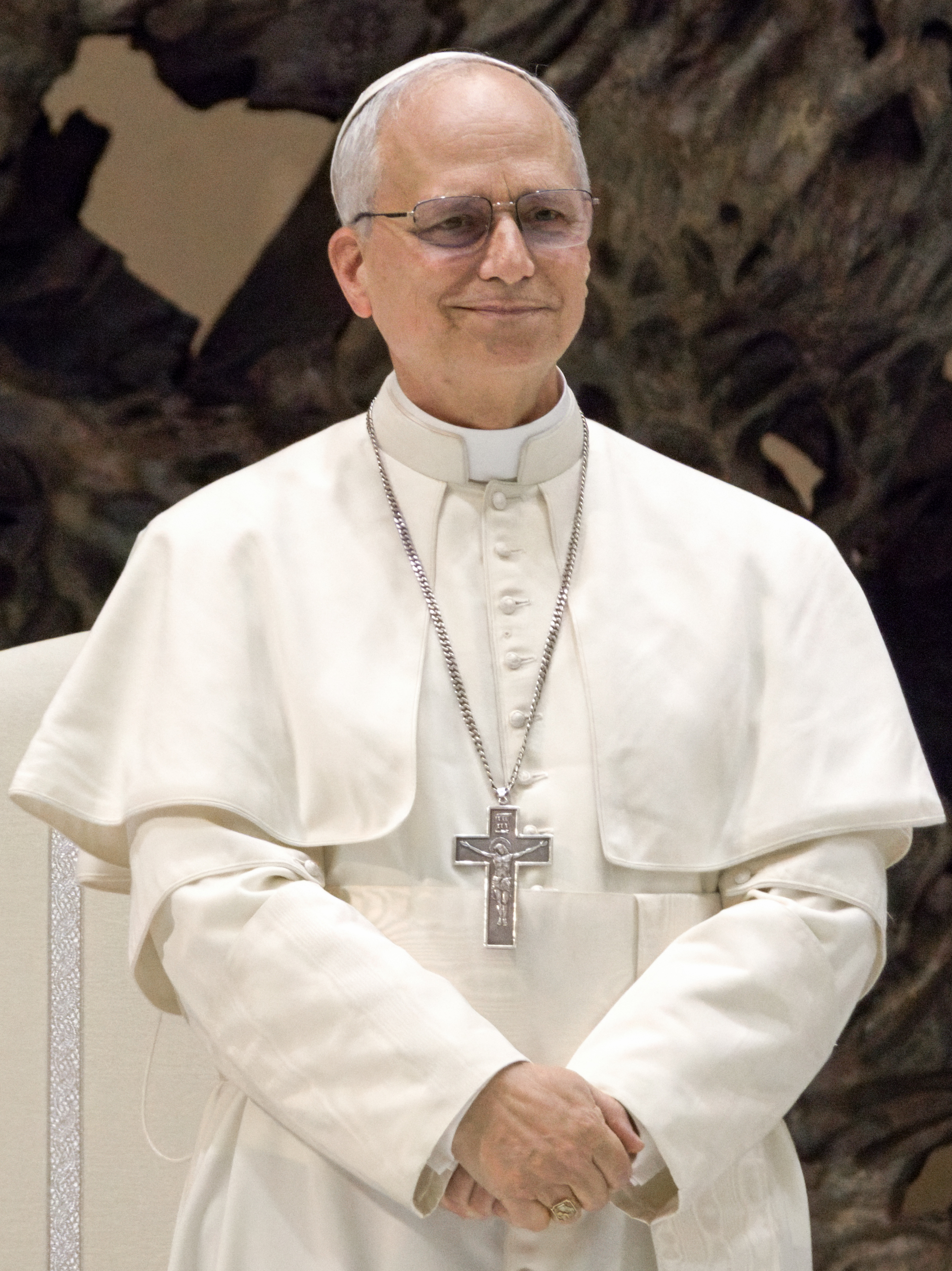
May 8: Robert Francis Prevost, from Chicago, Illinois, is elected Pope Leo XIV.

- May 9 – Newark Mayor Ras Baraka is taken into custody while protesting outside the Delaney Hall ICE detention center. He is released several hours later.
- May 12
  - Trump announces a plan to pressure drug companies to lower US costs by 50% to 90%.
  - The Trump administration brought the first group of white South Africans to the US through its refugee program. South Africa's foreign ministry called the move "politically motivated." The Episcopal Church of the US responded by terminating their partnership with the federal government, as they were morally opposed to resettling the white Afrikaners.
- May 13 – Saudi Arabia announces a $600 billion investment in the US, including Nvidia AI chips, Boeing planes, a $142 billion defense deal, a $20 billion DataVolt energy project, $14.2 billion in GE Vernova exports, and others.
- May 14 – Trump signs an agreement with Qatar to facilitate economic exchanges valued at a minimum of $1.2 trillion, including deals totaling more than $243.5 billion across sectors such as defense, aviation, infrastructure, and energy.
- May 15 – The United Arab Emirates announces plans to invest $1.4 trillion in the US over the next 10 years, focusing on AI infrastructure, semiconductors, energy, quantum computing, biotechnology, and manufacturing.
- May 15–16 – A major and deadly tornado outbreak occurred, spanning across the Midwest and Ohio valley, resulting in 27 fatalities.
  - A large and destructive tornado tore through the Greater St. Louis suburbs, damaging or destroying thousands of structures and resulting in 5 deaths and $1.6 billion in damage.
  - Later that night, a catastrophic and violent tornado tore through southern Somerset and London in southeast Kentucky, killing 19 and injuring 108 people.
- May 16
  - Hadi Matar, 27, is sentenced to 25 years in prison for stabbing and partially blinding novelist Salman Rushdie in August 2022.
  - Charter Communications announces a $34.5 billion merger deal with Cox Communications.
- May 17
  - Cuauhtémoc Brooklyn Bridge collision: Two crew members are killed and 25 others are injured, including two critically, when Mexican Navy training ship ARM Cuauhtémoc (BE01) with a crew of 277 people on a festive visit collides with the Brooklyn Bridge in New York City.
  - 2025 Palm Springs fertility clinic bombing: A car bomb is detonated outside a fertility clinic in Palm Springs, California. The bomber is the only fatality. Four people are injured.
- May 18 – Former president Joe Biden announces he was diagnosed with metastatic prostate cancer.
- May 19
  - The Supreme Court rules that the Trump administration can revoke temporary protected status for 350,000 Venezuelan immigrants.
  - Trump signs the TAKE IT DOWN Act into law, which makes revenge porn a crime.
- May 20 – The US Senate passes the bipartisan No Tax on Tips Act bill by unanimous consent.

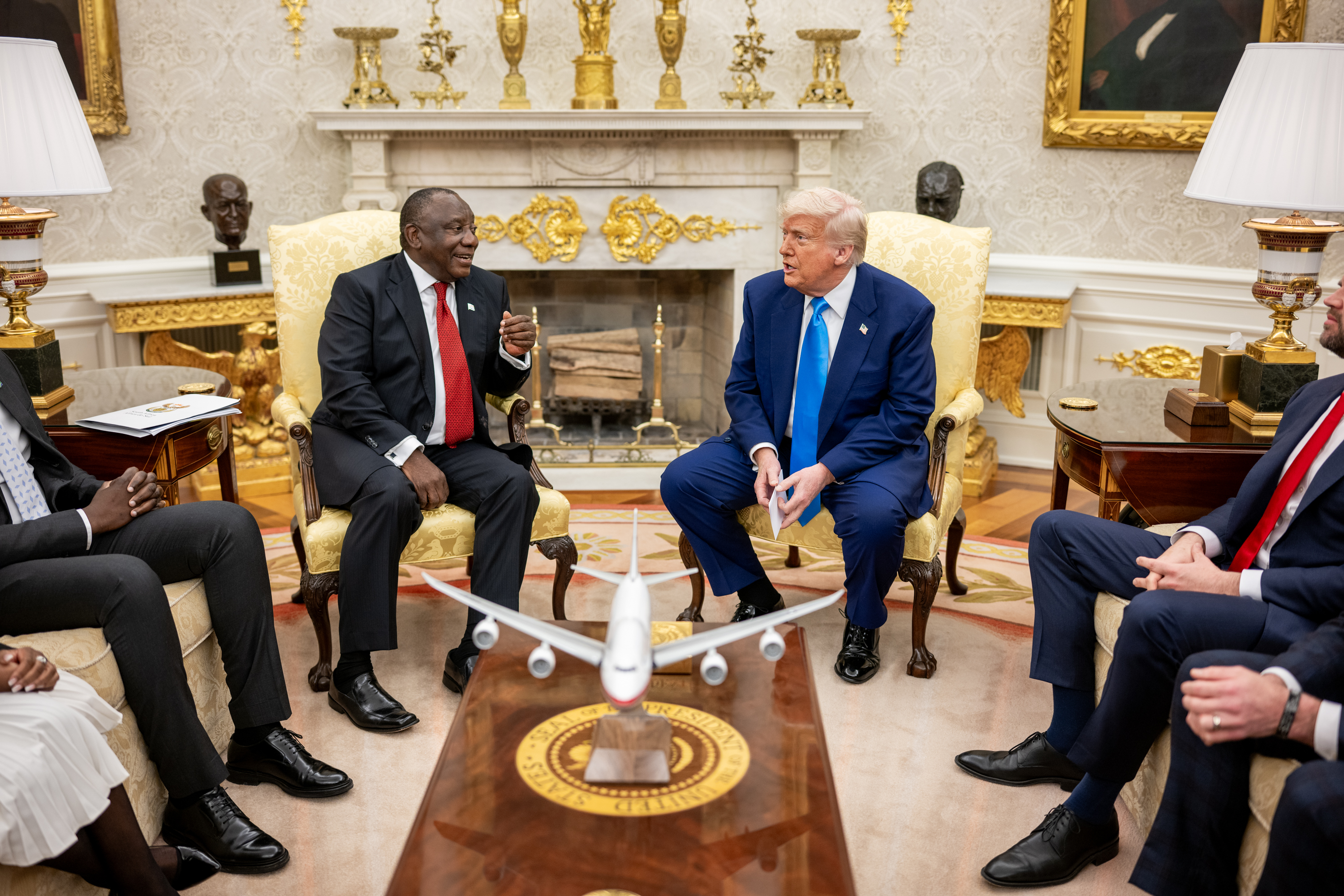
May 21: President Trump accuses South African President Cyril Ramaphosa of his government committing genocide against white Afrikaners during an Oval Office meeting.

- May 21
  - 2025 Trump–Ramaphosa Oval Office meeting: Trump confronts South African president Cyril Ramaphosa at the White House during a state visit by Ramaphosa, making false claims that there is a genocide against Afrikaners in South Africa, which Ramaphosa strongly denies.
  - 2025 killing of Israeli embassy workers in Washington, D.C.: Two Israeli Embassy staffers are shot and killed outside the Capital Jewish Museum in Washington, D.C., after attending an American Jewish Committee event at the museum. The suspect is arrested at the scene.
- May 22
  - The House passes Trump's One Big Beautiful Bill Act.
  - The Trump administration halts Harvard University's ability to enroll international students and requires existing international students to transfer to other schools. A judge blocks the order.
  - A Cessna Citation II crashes in San Diego, killing all six occupants of the aircraft.
  - Universal Epic Universe opens to the public in Orlando, Florida.
- May 23 – 2025 killing of Israeli Embassy workers in Washington, D.C.: Elias Rodriguez, the suspect in the killing of two Israeli embassy workers in Washington, D.C. two days ago, is charged with two counts of first-degree murder along with other charges both federally and locally.
- May 27 – US abortion-rights movement, abortion in Missouri: The Missouri Supreme Court orders a judge in Kansas City to reinstate enforcement of the state's near-total abortion ban.
- May 28 – Elon Musk formally announces that he will be stepping down from the Trump administration, but claims that DOGE "will continue".
- May 29
  - The National Association of the Deaf files a lawsuit against the White House for not providing American Sign Language interpreters during press and media briefings.
  - The Supreme Court rules that Trump can legally revoke the temporary protected status (TPS) of Cuban, Haitian, Nicaraguan, and Venezuelan immigrants in the country, totaling over 530,000 people. This comes after the Supreme Court previously allowed the Trump administration to revoke the TPS of over 250,000 Venezuelans living and working in the US.
- May 31 – The White House rescinds Trump's nomination of tech magnate Jared Isaacman for NASA Administrator.

=== June ===
- June 1 – 2025 Boulder fire attack: Police arrest a man who allegedly attacked pro-Israel demonstrators with Molotov cocktails at Pearl Street Mall in Boulder, Colorado, which injured seven people, including the perpetrator.
- June 4
  - Trump signs Proclamation 10949, which bans nationals from 12 countries, mostly in Africa and the Middle East, from entering the US.
  - Contrary to all other member nations, the US vetoes a UN Security Council resolution that calls for an immediate and permanent ceasefire in Gaza.

June 4: President Trump signs a proclamation to ban nationals from 12 countries from entering the US.

- June 5
  - Elon Musk and Donald Trump begin a social media feud. Musk makes multiple posts critical of Trump and of the Big Beautiful Bill on X; he claims that the bill will increase the deficit, that Trump would have lost the election without him, and that Trump's name is in the Jeffrey Epstein client list. Trump responds by saying that Musk "went crazy" after Trump "took away his EV Mandate that forced everyone to buy Electric Cars".
  - The Department of Justice launches an investigation into Rhode Island's diversity in hiring practices.
  - House Oversight chair James Comer subpoenas Joe Biden's White House physician as part of a probe into Biden's mental fitness during his time in office.
- June 6
  - Kilmar Abrego Garcia returns to the US after being deported to El Salvador and held at the CECOT maximum security prison. He faces charges of trafficking migrants.
  - Grant Hardin, who had escaped from North Central Unit prison in Calico Rock, Arkansas on May 25 by disguising himself as a guard, is recaptured by law enforcement about 1.5 miles away from the prison that he escaped, ending the manhunt.
- June 7 – June 2025 Los Angeles protests: Trump signs a memorandum deploying 2,000 members of the California National Guard to quell protests, which had started a day earlier because of ICE raids.
- June 8
  - All six occupants are killed in the 2025 San Diego Cessna 414 crash.
  - The 78th Tony Awards are held in New York City.
- June 9
  - Salmonellosis in the US: At least 79 people are infected, including 21 who were hospitalized, with a strain of salmonella from consuming recalled eggs in seven states in the West and Midwest.
  - June 2025 Los Angeles protests: California Attorney General Rob Bonta announces he and the state of California is suing the Trump administration over the "unlawful and unprecedented" deployment of the California National Guard to quell protests against ICE abductions and deportations of locals.
- June 12
  - Micron announces a $200 billion investment in semiconductor manufacturing and research and development (R&D) in the US.
  - One US Army soldier is killed and another is injured in a helicopter training accident at Fort Campbell in Hopkinsville, Kentucky.
  - JetZero announces it will open a new plant in Greensboro, North Carolina, aiming to create 14,500 jobs.
- June 13 – Heavy flooding hits San Antonio, Texas; at least 11 people are killed, and the San Antonio River rises from 3 feet to 25 feet in about 2 hours.
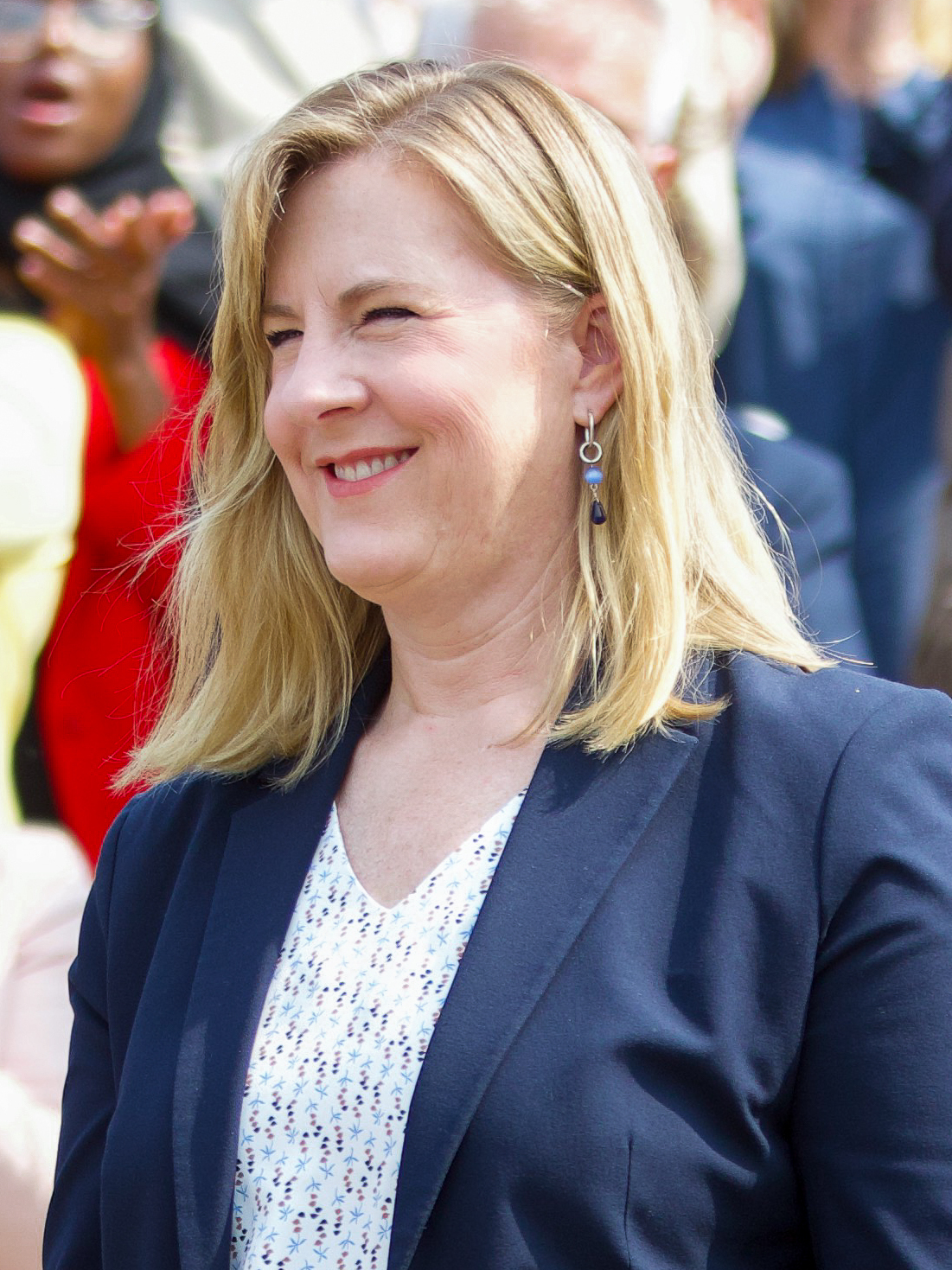
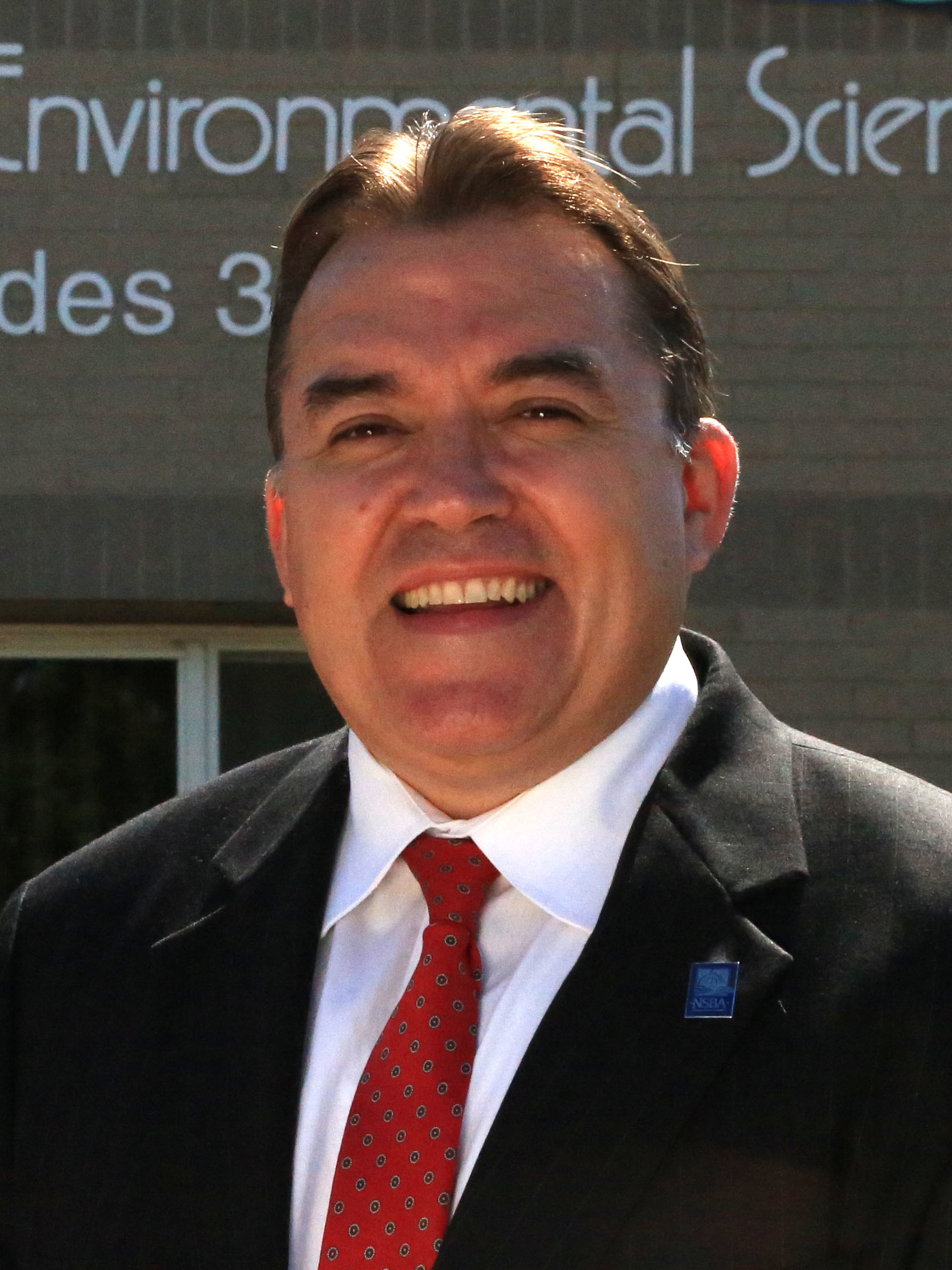
June 14: State representative Melissa Hortman (left) and her husband are shot and killed, while state senator John Hoffman (right) and his wife are injured at their homes.
- June 14
  - 2025 shootings of Minnesota legislators: Two Minnesota lawmakers are shot at their homes by a gunman impersonating a police officer. State Representative Melissa Hortman and her husband are killed at their Brooklyn Park home, and State Senator John Hoffman and his wife and injured at their Champlin home.
  - The US Army 250th Anniversary Parade takes place, coinciding with Trump's birthday.
  - In response to the parade and the Trump presidency, the No Kings protests are held across various US cities.
  - At least six people are killed and two others are missing in flash floods over the weekend in Ohio County, West Virginia.
  - The WNBA inducts Sue Bird, Sylvia Fowles, Cappie Pondexter, and Alana Beard into its 2025 Hall of Fame.
- June 14 – July 13: The 2025 FIFA Club World Cup takes place in 11 cities across the US.
- June 15 – Three people are killed, including an infant, and two teenagers are injured in a shooting following a confrontation at a carnival in West Valley City, Utah.
- June 16 – Furniture retailer At Home files for Chapter 11 bankruptcy as a result of the increased tariffs, as well as a declining number of customers.
- June 17
  - The Florida Panthers defeat the Edmonton Oilers in the 2025 Stanley Cup Final, claiming their second consecutive Stanley Cup.
  - Federal judge Julia Kobick blocks the State Department from enforcing an executive order to ban gender-neutral passports.
  - The Trump administration ends funding for the LGBTQ youth option on the Suicide and Crisis Lifeline, accusing the service and its provider, the Trevor Project, of "radical gender ideology".
- June 18
  - After 18 months of negotiations, Japanese company Nippon Steel finalizes its $14.9 billion acquisition of U.S. Steel. The deal allows U.S. Steel to retain its name and headquarters in Pittsburgh, Pennsylvania, and gives the U.S. government the ability to veto corporate decisions as needed.
  - The Supreme Court votes 6–3 to uphold a Tennessee law to ban gender-affirming care for minors, allowing individual states to implement similar bans.
  - The Food and Drug Administration approves Gilead Sciences's new lenacapavir drug, marketed as Yeztugo, for the treatment of HIV.
  - Death of John O'Keefe: Karen Read is found not guilty of murder in the death of her boyfriend, Boston Police Officer John O'Keefe, who died on the front lawn of another Boston Police officer in 2022.
- June 19
  - Americans celebrate Juneteenth on the 160th anniversary of the date when Union troops brought news of the Emancipation Proclamation to enslaved people in Galveston, Texas.
  - June 2025 Los Angeles protests: A panel of three federal judges in the Ninth Circuit rules that Trump is allowed to keep the National Guard under federal control in California.
- June 20
  - The Conservation Fund finalizes a $60 million deal to buy 7,700 acres (31 km^{2}) outside of the Okefenokee Swamp on the Georgia–Florida border that would have become a titanium dioxide mine.
  - Detention of Mahmoud Khalil: Federal judge Michael E. Farbiarz orders the release of pro-Palestine activist Mahmoud Khalil from ICE custody after he was detained at Columbia University three months before.
  - Three people are killed when an EF5 tornado passes through Enderlin, North Dakota.

June 21: Trump announces that the US has bombed nuclear sites in Iran.

- June 21
  - After calling for Supreme Leader Ali Khamenei's unconditional surrender on June 17, Trump sends B-2 Spirit bombers to carry out airstrikes on three Iranian nuclear facilities in Fordow, Natanz, and Isfahan.
  - Texas Governor Greg Abbott signs a law that will require all public schools to display the Ten Commandments in their classrooms. A similar law was blocked by a federal court in Louisiana the previous day.
  - Six people are killed and two others are missing after a boat carrying ten people capsizes on Lake Tahoe in the Sierra Nevada.
- June 22 – 2025 NBA Finals: In basketball, the Oklahoma City Thunder win the NBA Finals in 7 games against the Indiana Pacers, winning their second championship in franchise history and their first at their home stadium. Shai Gilgeous-Alexander is named NBA Finals MVP.
- June 23 – Agriculture Secretary Brooke Rollins announces an end to the "roadless rule" protecting nearly a third of forests in the United States, enabling 58 million acres of land to be opened up to road construction and development.
- June 24
  - Twelve-Day War: Trump uses an expletive in front of reporters, as he accuses both Iran and Israel of violating a ceasefire announced the previous night.
  - Zohran Mamdani becomes the presumptive Democratic nominee in the New York mayoral primary following the concession of Andrew Cuomo.
  - At least 20 people are injured when lightning strikes Lake Murray in South Carolina.
- June 27
  - In three separate decisions, the Supreme Court rules that lower court orders are limited on nationwide injunctions in Trump v. CASA, Inc., that teaching using LGBTQ-themed books in public schools without parental opt-outs violates the Free Exercise Clause in Mahmoud v. Taylor, and upholds the Texas law requiring age verification for accessing pornographic websites.
  - The S&P 500 index closes at a record high of 6173.07 points, the highest since February.
- June 28 – California governor Gavin Newsom files a $787 million defamation lawsuit against Fox News over misrepresentation of a phone call between him and Trump.
- June 29
  - 2025 Coeur d'Alene shooting: Two firefighters are killed and one is hospitalized by a gunman after a fire is intentionally set to ambush them in Coeur d'Alene, Idaho.
  - Six people are killed when a Cessna 441 aircraft crashes into a residential area in Howland Township, Ohio, shortly after takeoff from Youngstown Regional Airport.

Gun-related suicides and homicides in the United States.

- June 30 – Gun violence in the United States: A report by the Johns Hopkins Bloomberg School of Public Health details that gun-related suicide in the United States is at a record-high for the third year in a row as of 2023, with 58% of all gun deaths being suicides.

=== July ===
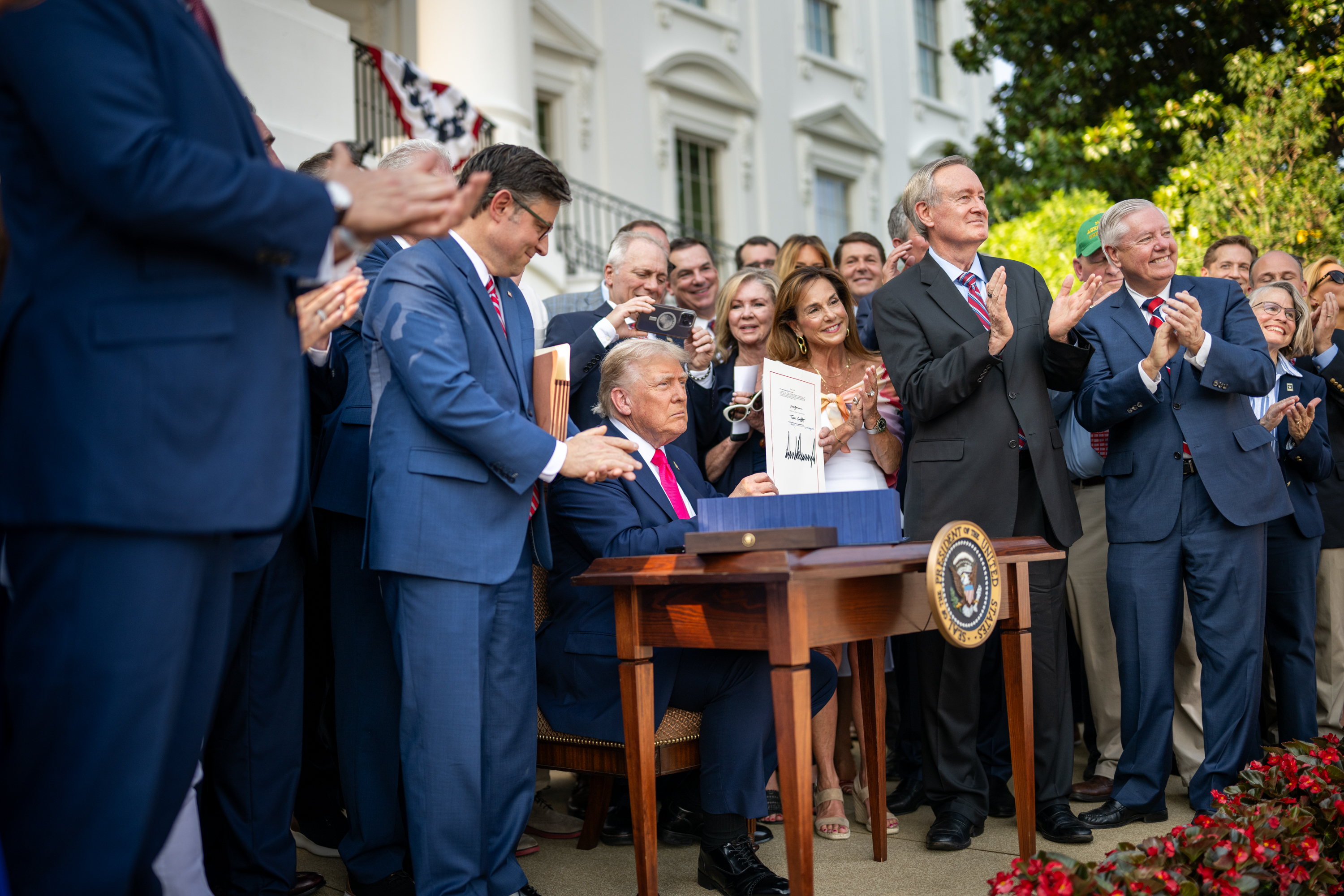
Enactment of the OBBBA on July 4, 2025.

- July 1
  - The One Big Beautiful Bill Act passes in the Senate with a 51–50 vote, with Vice President JD Vance casting a tiebreaker vote. The bill is signed into law by President Donald Trump three days later.
  - Manufacturing company Jabil announces plans to build a $500 million manufacturing facility for cloud computing and artificial intelligence data centers in Rowan County, North Carolina, which will create 1,200 jobs by 2030.
  - The American Federation of State, County and Municipal Employees union in Philadelphia, Pennsylvania, the city's largest workers' union of over 9,000 city workers goes on strike to demand negotiations over pay.
  - An explosion at a fireworks warehouse in Esparto, California, kills seven people.
- July 2
  - Sean "Diddy" Combs is found not guilty of racketeering, and not guilty of sex trafficking ex-partner Casandra Ventura and another woman referred to as "Jane". He is found guilty of transportation to engage in prostitution, related to both women.
  - The Wisconsin Supreme Court overturns the state's 176-year-old ban on abortion.
  - Del Monte Foods files for Chapter 11 bankruptcy protection.
  - 2025 Chicago shooting: A mass drive-by-shooting outside of a nightclub in Chicago, Illinois, kills four people and injures 14 others.
  - Former WBC middleweight champion Julio César Chávez Jr. is arrested by U.S. Immigration and Customs Enforcement at his home in Los Angeles due to Chávez Jr.'s affiliation with the Sinaloa Cartel, which the U.S. has designated a Foreign Terrorist Organization.
- July 3 – The first group of immigrant detainees arrives at Alligator Alcatraz in Florida, beginning the facility's operations.
- July 4–7 – 135 people are killed and dozens reported missing during a flood in Central Texas, United States.
- July 5 – Two teenagers are killed and five other people are hospitalized in a mass shooting in Indianapolis, Indiana.
- July 6 – 2025 CONCACAF Gold Cup: Mexico defeats the United States in the CONCACAF Gold Cup final 2–1 at NRG Stadium in Houston, Texas, to win their record 10th title.

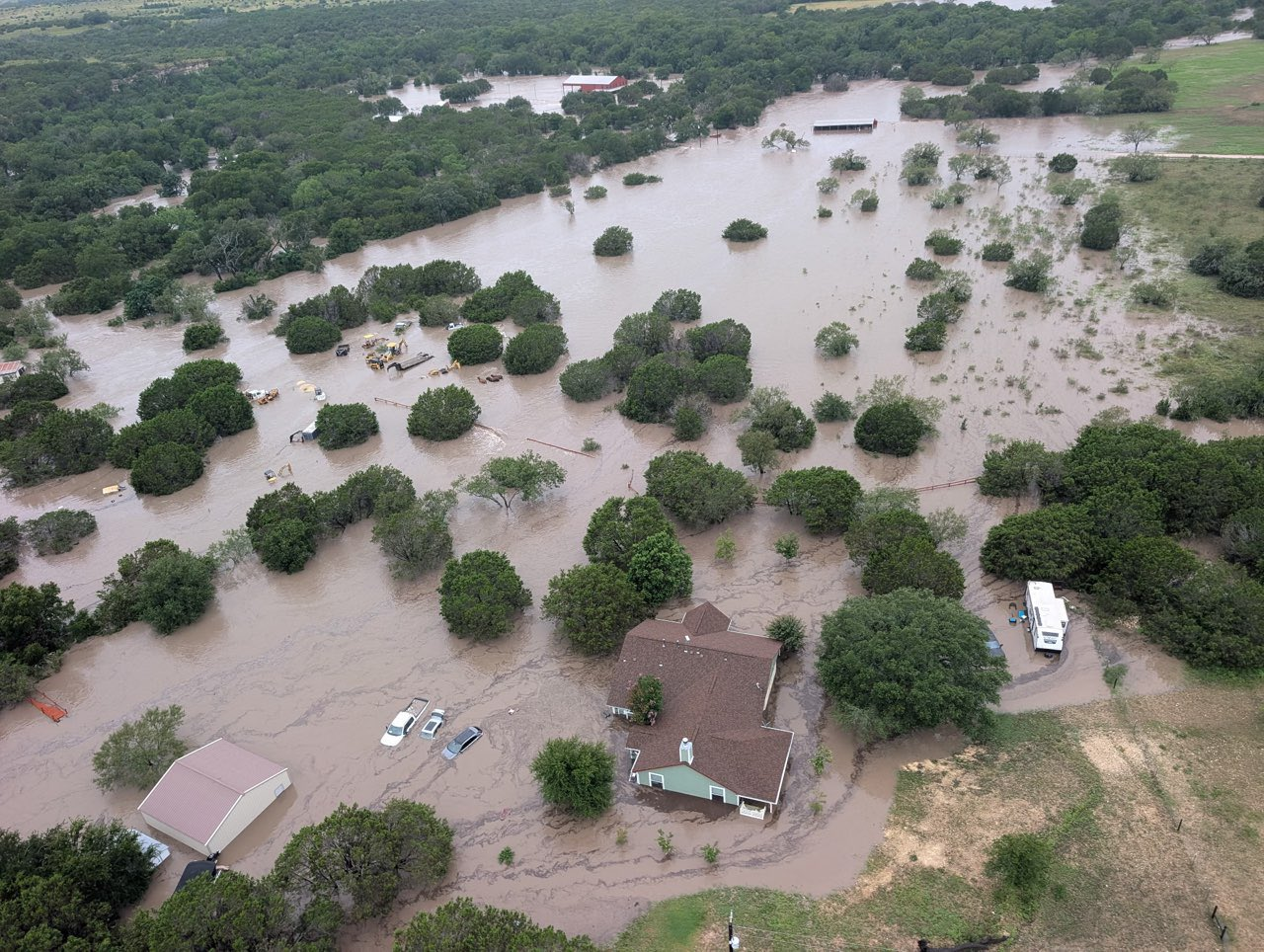
July 4–5: Widespread flooding is seen in the Texas Hill Country.

- July 7
  - Three people are killed and nine others are injured in a mass shooting in the Grays Ferry neighbourhood of Philadelphia, Pennsylvania.
  - The TSA drops the requirement for travelers to remove their shoes in the security checkpoints of some airports.
  - The perpetrator is killed and three law enforcement officers are injured in a mass shooting when a man opens fire on them before being fatally shot at a Border Patrol facility in McAllen, Texas.
  - Measles resurgence in the United States: Measles cases reach a 33-year high, with a total of 1,281 infections reported.
  - The Internal Revenue Service rules that churches can endorse political candidates for the first time since 1954.
- July 8
  - Unfunded by the One Big Beautiful Bill Act, the Trump administration and the United States Congress eliminate the U.S. Chemical Safety and Hazard Investigation Board.
  - The United States and Israel sign a memorandum of understanding to promote cooperation on artificial intelligence and energy innovation.
- July 9
  - Cyclist Greg LeMond, three-time Tour de France winner, is awarded the Congressional Gold Medal at the Capitol. He was scheduled to receive the medal in 2020 but was delayed by the COVID-19 pandemic.
  - Linda Yaccarino announces her resignation as CEO of X.
  - 31 workers are rescued when a tunnel boring machine partially collapses an industrial tunnel in Wilmington, Los Angeles, California.
- July 10
  - President Trump announces a 50% tariff on most imports from Brazil starting August 1 in a letter addressed to Brazilian president Luiz Inácio Lula da Silva and citing the trial of former Brazilian president Jair Bolsonaro.
  - Trump also announces a new set of tariffs on imports from Algeria, Brunei, Iraq, Libya, Moldova, the Philippines, and Sri Lanka, assigning country-specific duties ranging 20 to 30% following the expiration of a 90-day negotiation period.
- July 11
  - The United States opens its first rare earth mine in 70 years in Wyoming.
  - Immigration raids at Glass House marijuana farms in California lead to clashes with protesters; tear gas is deployed and National Guard troops are called in.
- July 13
  - July 2025 Central Texas floods: Emergency crews suspend the search for the missing victims from last week's floods in Central Texas due to new heavy rain and flash flood warnings.
  - In an attack at a church in Lexington, Kentucky, a gunman shoots a state trooper, carjacks a vehicle, then kills two women and injures two men before police kill him.
- July 14 – 24 states sue the Department of Education to unfreeze education funding that was frozen without notice or reason, ahead of the start of the school year.
- July 15
  - The United States sees a 10-year high in executions with 26 executions as of 2025.
  - The Trump administration withdraws 2,000 National Guard soldiers from the Los Angeles area while the other 2,000 will remain to help enforce immigration raids.
  - House Republicans block a Democratic attempt to force a vote on releasing the Epstein files. The final vote is 211 to 210, with zero Republicans supporting the measure.
  - President Trump announces a private-sector investment initiative totaling more than $90 billion in Pennsylvania. The investment comes from companies across the technology, energy, and finance sectors. Participating firms include Anthropic, Blackstone, Brookfield, CoreWeave, BlackRock, Google, Constellation Energy, and Meta.
  - The Subcommittee on Commerce, Justice and Science (CJS) votes to reject a planned 24.3% cut in NASA funding contained in the White House's fiscal 2026 budget proposal.

The California High-Speed Rail project as of May 2025, prior to President Trump's federal funding rescindment.

- July 16
  - Maurene Comey, a prosecutor in the federal cases against Sean "Diddy" Combs and Jeffrey Epstein, is fired by the Department of Justice.
  - Trump rescinds $4 billion in funding for the California High-Speed Rail project.
  - One person is killed and 13 others are injured in a lightning strike at an archery range in Jackson Township, New Jersey.
  - A tsunami advisory is issued after a M_{w} 7.3 earthquake strikes the southern coast of Alaska.
  - Anti-fentanyl legislation in the United States: President Trump signs into law the HALT Fentanyl Act, reclassifying all fentanyl-related substances, including synthetic drugs, as Schedule I controlled substances.
- July 17
  - Puerto Rico bans hormone therapy and gender-affirming surgery for those under 21, with penalties including prison time and fines.
  - Disney's live-action animated remake of Lilo & Stitch crosses the $1 billion threshold at the box office two months after its release, becoming the first American film of 2025 to do so and the highest-grossing live-action/animated hybrid film of all time.
- July 18
  - At least three people are killed in an explosion at a Los Angeles County Sheriff's Department training facility in Monterey Park, California.
  - Trump sues media tycoon Rupert Murdoch for $10 billion after the Wall Street Journal reports allegations that Trump's name appeared on a "bawdy" 2003 birthday card to sex offender Jeffrey Epstein.
  - At least four people are killed and over a dozen others are injured in a multiple-vehicle collision on Interstate 35 in San Antonio, Texas.
  - The government designates Pakistani militant group Lashkar-e-Taiba a terrorist group for their role in the Pahalgam attack in April.
  - Ten Americans are released from Venezuela during a prisoner exchange with Venezuela and El Salvador.
  - The Department of Justice asks a federal court to unseal grand jury transcripts in Jeffrey Epstein's case at the direction of Donald Trump.
- July 19 – 30 people are injured when a car drives into pedestrians outside a club on Santa Monica Boulevard in East Hollywood, Los Angeles. The driver of the vehicle is shot and injured, though it is not known if they were shot before or after the crash.
- July 20
  - A Piper PA-46 light aircraft crashes in Lancaster County, Pennsylvania, killing the pilot on board.
  - Two people are killed and one other is missing after a group of hikers are swept over Dillon Falls in Deschutes County, Oregon.
- July 21
  - AstraZeneca announces it will invest $50 billion in the United States by 2030. The investment will support the construction of a new drug manufacturing facility in Virginia and expand research and development and cell therapy manufacturing in Maryland, Massachusetts, California, Indiana, and Texas.
  - Following the withdrawal of 2,000 National Guardsmen last week, the Pentagon announces the withdrawal of all 700 Marines who were deployed to Los Angeles, California.
  - Immigrant detention in the United States: The Department of Homeland Security approves an order to expand the capabilities of Camp Atterbury in Indiana and Joint Base McGuire-Dix-Lakehurst in New Jersey to detain illegal migrants.
  - Killing of Breonna Taylor: A federal jury and judge find Brett Hankison, a former Louisville Metro Police Department officer and an accomplice in the killing of Breonna Taylor, guilty and sentence him to 33 months in prison.
  - The United States Olympic & Paralympic Committee bans transgender women from competing in women's sports in compliance with Executive Order 14201.
- July 22 – The United States and Japan announce a new trade framework. The framework includes 15% reciprocal tariffs on Japanese goods entering the United States, a $550 billion investment commitment from Japanese companies in the US, a joint U.S.-Japan venture on an LNG project in Alaska, and other initiatives.
- July 23
  - 2022 University of Idaho murders: Bryan Kohberger receives four consecutive life sentences in prison without the possibility of parole plus 10 years for the murder of four university students in 2022.
  - The Wall Street Journal reports that the Justice Department told Trump in May that his name appeared in many of the Epstein files.
- July 24
  - Merger of Skydance Media and Paramount Global: The Federal Communications Commission (FCC) approves an $8 billion merger between Paramount Global and Skydance Media.
  - Union Pacific Railroad and Norfolk Southern Railway announce a merger to form a joint railroad service from the West Coast to the East Coast.
  - Trump signs an executive order aimed at cracking down on homelessness in the United States.
  - Lieutenant Governor David M. Apatang is sworn in as the new governor of the Northern Mariana Islands following the death of Governor Arnold Palacios the previous day.
  - Intel announces planned layoffs for over 20,000 employees by the end of the year.
- July 25 – One person is killed and another is wounded in a shooting at a University of New Mexico dormitory building in Albuquerque, New Mexico.
- July 26
  - 2025 Traverse City stabbing attack: Eleven people are injured, including several critically, in a mass stabbing attack at a Walmart in Traverse City, Michigan. The suspect is arrested by local police.
  - Six people are killed and another is injured in a traffic accident on Interstate 485 in Charlotte, North Carolina.
- July 27
  - The United States and the European Union announce a new trade framework. This includes 15% reciprocal tariffs on European goods entering the United States, a $600 billion investment commitment from the EU, European imports of American energy worth $750 billion by 2028, and additional European purchases of military equipment, automobiles, aircraft, and technology products.
  - Three people are killed when a Beech 95-B55 Baron aircraft crashes into the Pacific Ocean off Point Pinos in California.

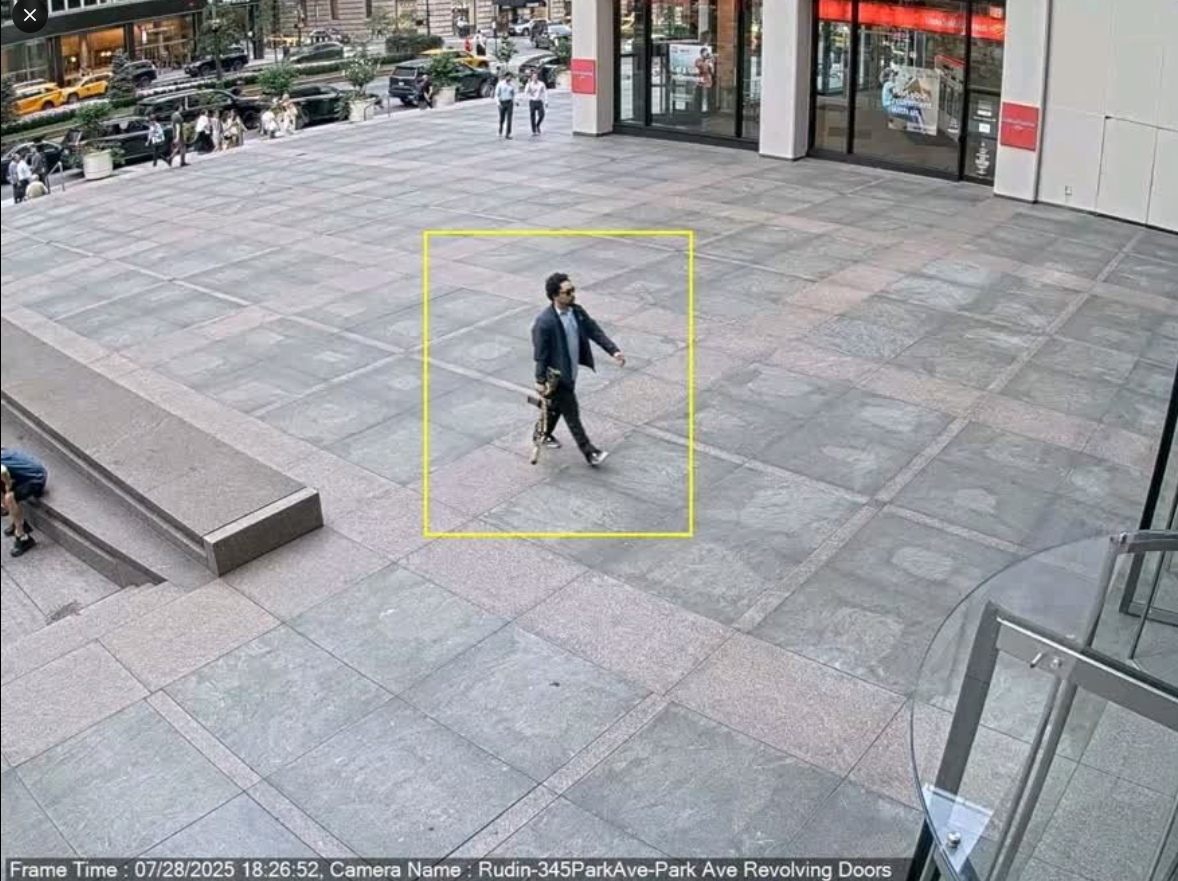
July 28: A man shoots and kills five people, and injures five others at a skyscraper in New York City.

- July 28
  - One person is killed and ten others are injured in a shooting in a nightlife district of Sweet Auburn in Atlanta, Georgia.
  - 2025 New York City shooting: Five people are killed, including an NYPD officer and the perpetrator, and five others are injured, including four with non-gunshot injuries, in a mass shooting at the 345 Park Avenue skyscraper in Manhattan, New York.
  - Grand Sierra Resort shooting: Three people are killed and eight others are injured in a mass shooting at the Grand Sierra Resort in Reno, Nevada.
  - The Peace Conference on Gaza opens in New York City, aimed at reviving the two-state solution and renewing diplomatic efforts to resolve the Israeli–Palestinian conflict.
- July 30
  - Francis Scott Key Bridge collapse: The city of Baltimore, Maryland, begins demolition on the last pieces of the Francis Scott Key Bridge after its collapse in 2024. Its replacement is expected to open in 2028.
  - The United States and South Korea reach trade a new trade framework. This includes 15% reciprocal tariffs on South Korean goods entering the United States, a $350 billion investment commitment from South Korea, and South Korean imports of American energy worth $100 billion by 2028.
- July 31
  - Trump signs an executive order to reinstate the Presidential Fitness Test in public schools.
  - A federal judge blocks the Trump administration from ending TPS for 60,000 immigrants from Honduras, Nicaragua, and Nepal.

=== August ===
- August 1
  - Recreational cannabis sales begin in Delaware.
  - The Corporation for Public Broadcasting says it will shut down in 2026.
  - Ghislaine Maxwell transferred to minimum security prison in Bryan, Texas
- August 2 – The Office of Special Counsel begins investigating former assistant U.S. attorney Jack Smith, alleging he violated the Hatch Act during his investigations of President Trump prior to Trump's election.
- August 4
  - The Culinary Workers Union in Las Vegas, Nevada, announces they have unionized every major casino hotel on the Las Vegas Strip for the first time in the city's history after successfully making first-ever deals with The Venetian and Fontainebleu.
  - The Texas House of Representatives votes to issue civil arrest warrants for more than 50 Democratic representatives who left the state in order to block a vote on a U.S. House of Representatives map that would give Republicans more seats. In Texas, at least 100 of the 150 representatives must be in the state for a vote. The civil arrest warrants only apply in Texas and are largely symbolic.
- August 5
  - Federal judge Timothy L. Brooks from the District Court of Arkansas blocks an Arkansas law requiring a copy of the Ten Commandments be displayed in all public schools and government buildings, which was signed into law by governor Sarah Huckabee Sanders last year.
  - Health Secretary Robert F. Kennedy Jr. announces the withdrawal of $500m in funding for mRNA vaccines targeted at diseases such as the flu and COVID-19, stating that "mRNA technology poses more risks than benefits for these respiratory viruses".
- August 6 – The DHS announces it is removing age restrictions for new hires at ICE.
- August 7
  - OpenAI launches GPT-5, a new and upgraded version of ChatGPT, featuring "PhD-level intelligence".
  - Apple Inc. CEO Tim Cook presents a gift to Donald Trump of a glass plaque (from Corning Inc., Harrodsburg, Kentucky) with a 24-karat bullion gold display base (from Utah), and announces a $100 billion commitment to U.S. manufacturing, amidst a Trump plan to impose an import tariff of 100% on semiconductor chips, a 25% tariff on Apple, 50% tariffs on Indian imports (exempting smartphones) and after Apple's 2025 February $500 billion investment commitment over the next five years, the aiming to hire 20,000 new employees, and manufacture AI servers. On August 6, Trump said Apple will dodge the new tariffs on semiconductors.
- August 9
  - A 17-year-old is arrested after three people are injured in a shooting during a dispute outside a Raising Cane's restaurant in New York City's Times Square.
  - Roblox Schlep ban controversy: The Roblox YouTuber Schlep receives a cease-and-desist letter from Roblox Corporation and is threatened with legal action for catching predators on the platform. This leads to protests both in Roblox games and in real life.

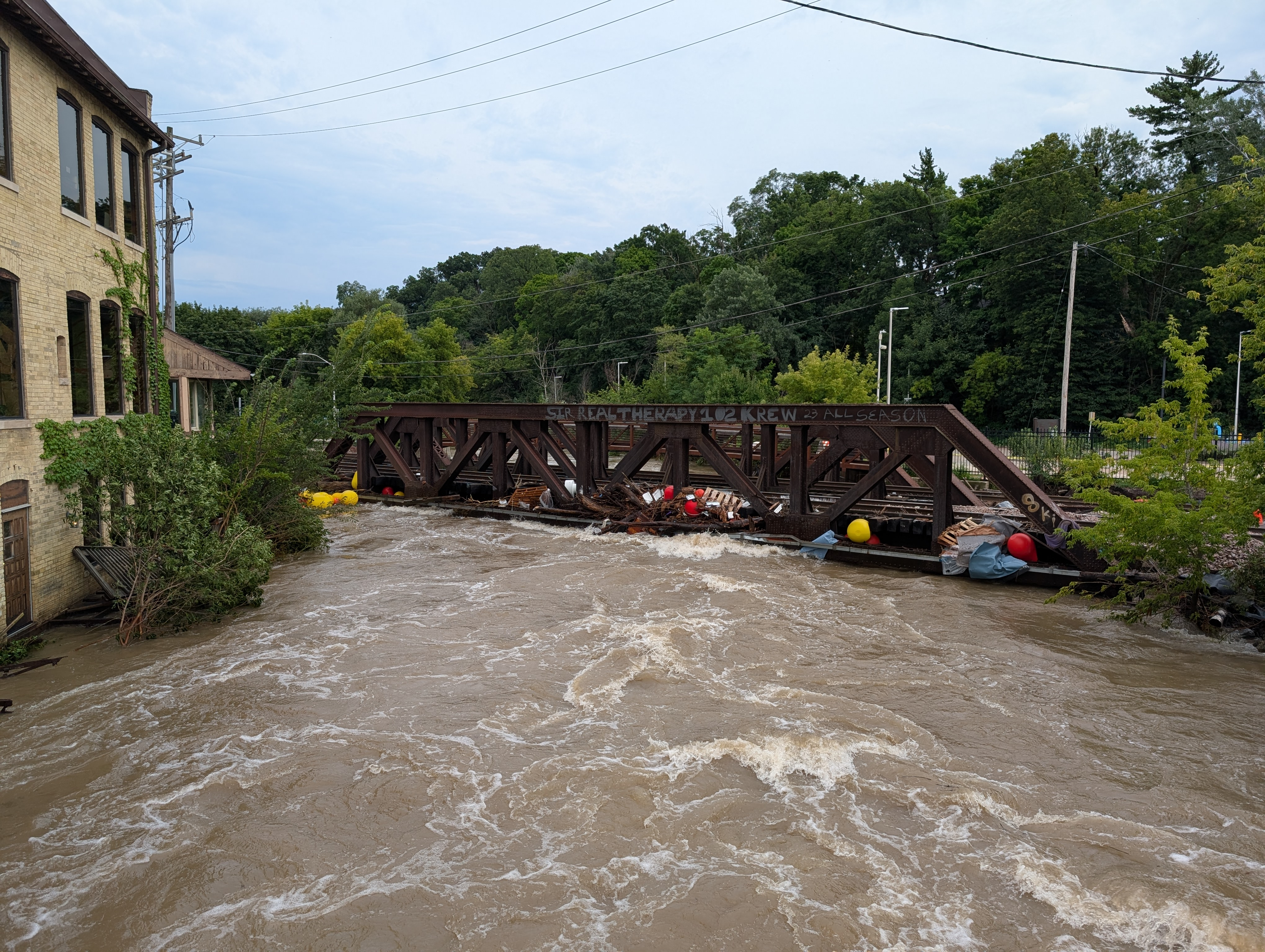
August 9–10: Flash flooding in the Milwaukee, Wisconsin, area.

- August 9–10 – A series of flash floods strike parts of the Milwaukee metropolitan area in Southeastern Wisconsin, resulting in the cancellations of a Lynyrd Skynyrd concert and the final day of the 2025 Wisconsin State Fair.
- August 11
  - Trump deploys the National Guard to Washington, DC and places the city's police under federal control, as he announces a crackdown on crime and homelessness in the capital.
  - An explosion at the Clairton Coke Works outside Pittsburgh, Pennsylvania, kills two people and injures another ten.
  - The US sees its largest job losses since the COVID-19 pandemic, with half of all industries laying off workers, and many economists predicting a recession.
- August 14 – The U.S. Navy and Marine Corps deploys 4,500 Marines and sailors to the southern Caribbean to conduct anti-drug trafficking operations and counter cartel activity.
- August 15 – Trump meets with Putin in Alaska to discuss a plan for resolving the conflict in Ukraine.
- August 17 – Organizers announce that the Gathering of Nations event in Albuquerque, New Mexico, will host its final pow-wow in 2026.
- August 18
  - Two police officers are killed in a shooting at Tremonton, Utah, and a third police officer is wounded in the same attack. The suspect is arrested at the scene.
  - MSNBC announces it will rebrand to MS NOW (an abbreviation of My Source [for] News, Opinion, [and the] World) as part of parent company NBCUniversal's spinning off of most of its cable networks to Versant, a new publicly traded company controlled by Comcast shareholders.
- August 21
  - International Paper Co. announces it will close down two paper mills in Georgia, laying off about 800 employees in Savannah and 300 in Riceboro. It will also sell its pulp and paper division to American Industrial Partners for $1.5 billion and spend $250 million to expand its cardboard production operation in Selma, Alabama.
  - Federal judge Kathleen Williams orders the closure of "Alligator Alcatraz", a controversial migrant detention centre in the Florida Everglades, citing its severe environmental damage. The Trump administration is given 60 days to wind down the facility's operations.

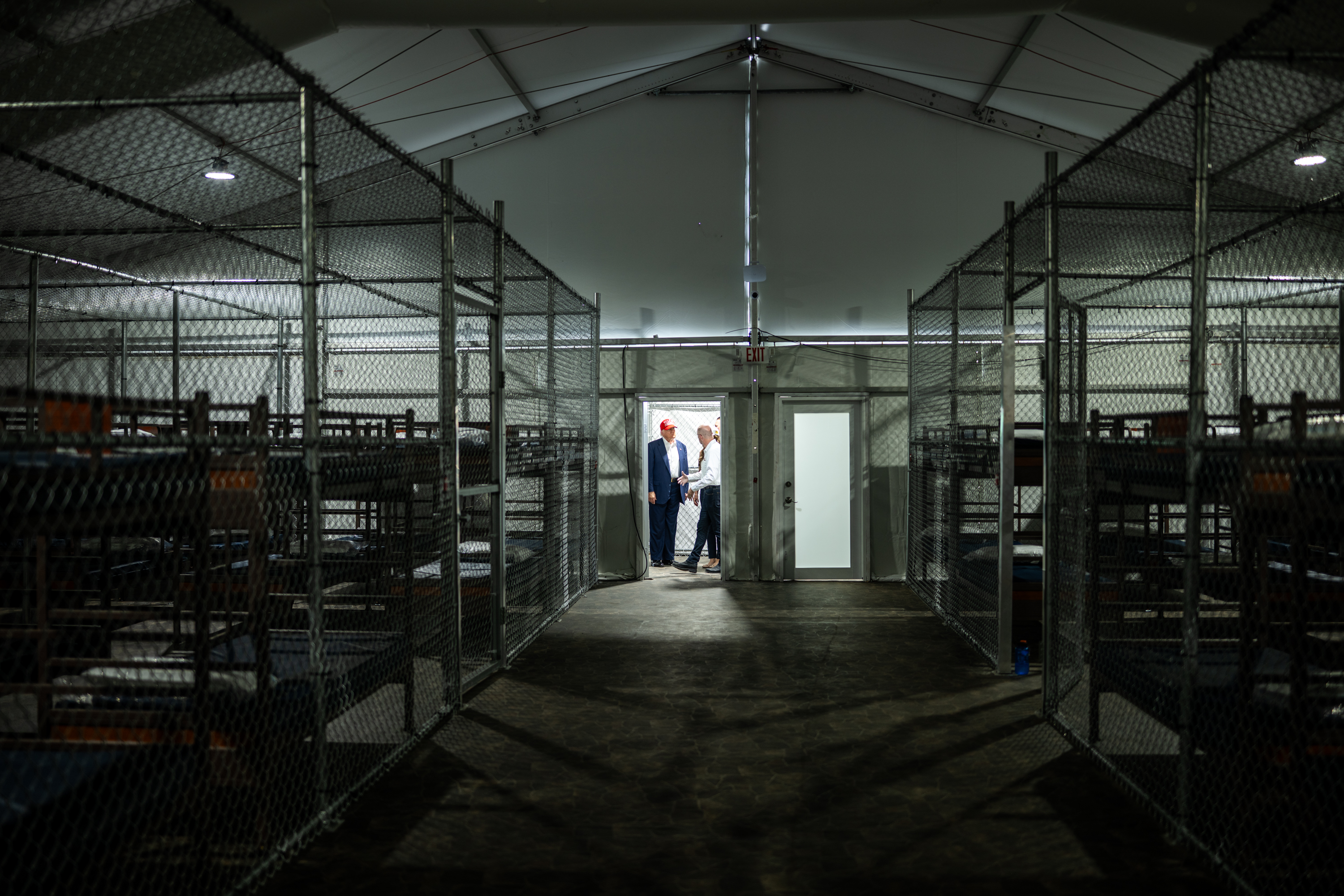
August 21: The interior of the South Florida Detention Facility, nicknamed "Alligator Alcatraz", which was ordered to close.

- August 22
  - The FBI raids the Maryland home of former national security advisor John Bolton.
  - The United States government takes a 10% equity stake in Intel in exchange for CHIPS Act funding allocated under the Biden administration.
  - Five people are killed and dozens injured after a tour bus with 52 passengers crashes near Pembroke, New York.
  - The killing of Iryna Zarutska occurred at the East/West Boulevard light rail station on the Lynx Blue Line in Charlotte, North Carolina, United States.
  - Ghislaine Maxwell, the convicted associate of sex offender Jeffrey Epstein, is reported to have told officials that a much-discussed "client list" does not exist.
- August 25 – President Trump signs an executive order directing federal prosecutors to seek charges against people who burn American flags, despite the 1989 Supreme Court case Texas v. Johnson affirming flag burning as protected speech under the First Amendment.
- August 26 – One person is killed and six others are wounded in a mass shooting near Cristo Rey Jesuit High School in Minneapolis, Minnesota.
- August 27
  - Annunciation Catholic Church shooting: Three people are killed, including two children and the perpetrator, and 21 others are wounded in a mass shooting at a Catholic church and school in Minneapolis, Minnesota.
  - Mark David Chapman, who shot and killed former Beatle John Lennon in 1980, is denied parole again.
- August 29
  - Texas governor Greg Abbott signs a new congressional map into law.
  - The 9th U.S. Circuit Court of Appeals rules that the Trump administration had likely acted unlawfully in ending TPS for Venezuelans, upholding a lower court ruling.
- August 31
  - The Trump administration cancels $679 million in federal funding for offshore wind turbines and redirects those funds towards the maritime industry.
  - Two people are killed and seven children are injured when two ATVs collide and overturn in Piedmont, Alabama.

=== September ===
- September 2
  - Trump announces the Space Operations Command headquarters will be moved from Colorado Springs, Colorado, to Huntsville, Alabama.
  - Disney agrees to pay $10 million to settle FTC claims of collecting children's data on YouTube without parental consent; it is required to implement an audience designation program.
- September 3 – A group of Jeffrey Epstein victims hold a press conference on Capitol Hill to announce they will create their own comprehensive abuser list to publicly expose those involved in the scandal.
- September 4 – Vaccination policy of the United States, vaccine hesitancy: The government of Florida announces it will formally eliminate all vaccination mandates, including school and childhood mandates for chickenpox, measles, and polio.
- September 5
  - Trump signs an executive order authorizing "Department of War" as an unofficial secondary title for the Department of Defense. The order does not rename the department, as that would require approval from Congress.
  - Authors Grady Hendrix and Jennifer Roberson file a class-action lawsuit against Apple in federal court in Northern California, alleging the company used copyrighted books without permission to train its AI system "OpenELM".

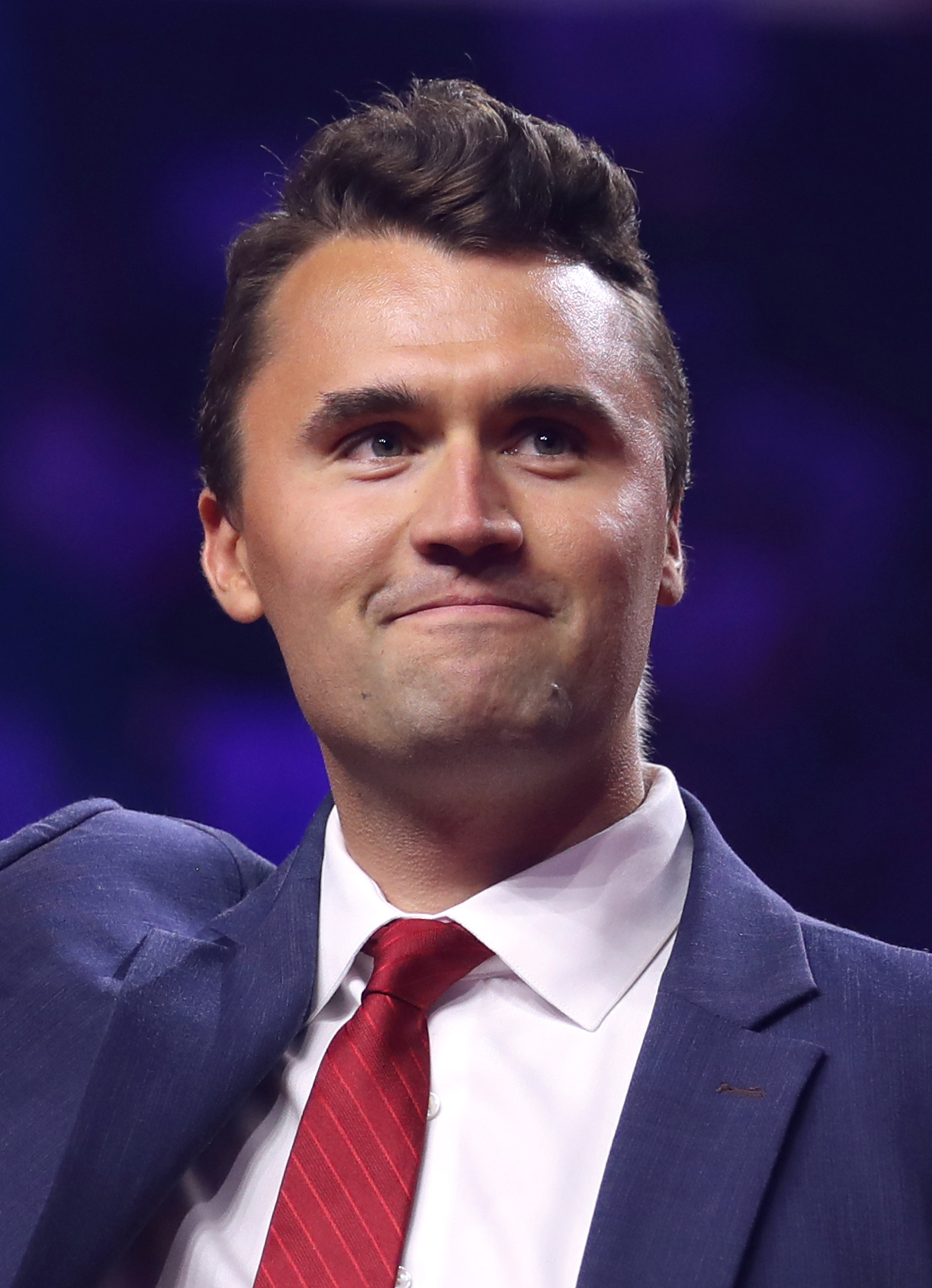
September 10: Charlie Kirk is assassinated during a campus event in Utah.

- September 8
  - The Second Circuit Court of Appeals in Manhattan fails to overturn E. Jean Carroll v. Donald J. Trump, which found Trump liable for sexual abuse and defamation. The court rejects his argument that the January 2024 verdict should be overturned because he deserved presidential immunity from Carroll's lawsuit.
  - The House Oversight Committee releases a "birthday book" compiled for Jeffrey Epstein in 2003, which includes a note allegedly signed by President Donald Trump; the White House denies its authenticity. The book is part of a larger trove of estate documents provided to the committee, containing Epstein's will and personal address book with contacts from politics, business, and entertainment.
- September 9 – The 80th session of the United Nations General Assembly opens in New York City.
- September 10 – Charlie Kirk, a right-wing activist and influential ally of President Trump, is assassinated at a campus event in Utah.
- September 11
  - The FBI release images of a "person of interest" in the Charlie Kirk assassination. A high-powered rifle is found in a wooded area, along with a "footwear impression…and a forearm imprint".
  - Former representative Madison Cawthorn is arrested in Florida after failing to attend a court date relating to his failure to drive with a valid license.
  - NASA begins blocking Chinese nationals with valid visas from joining its space programs.
- September 12 – A 22-year-old male suspect is arrested in connection with Charlie Kirk's assassination.

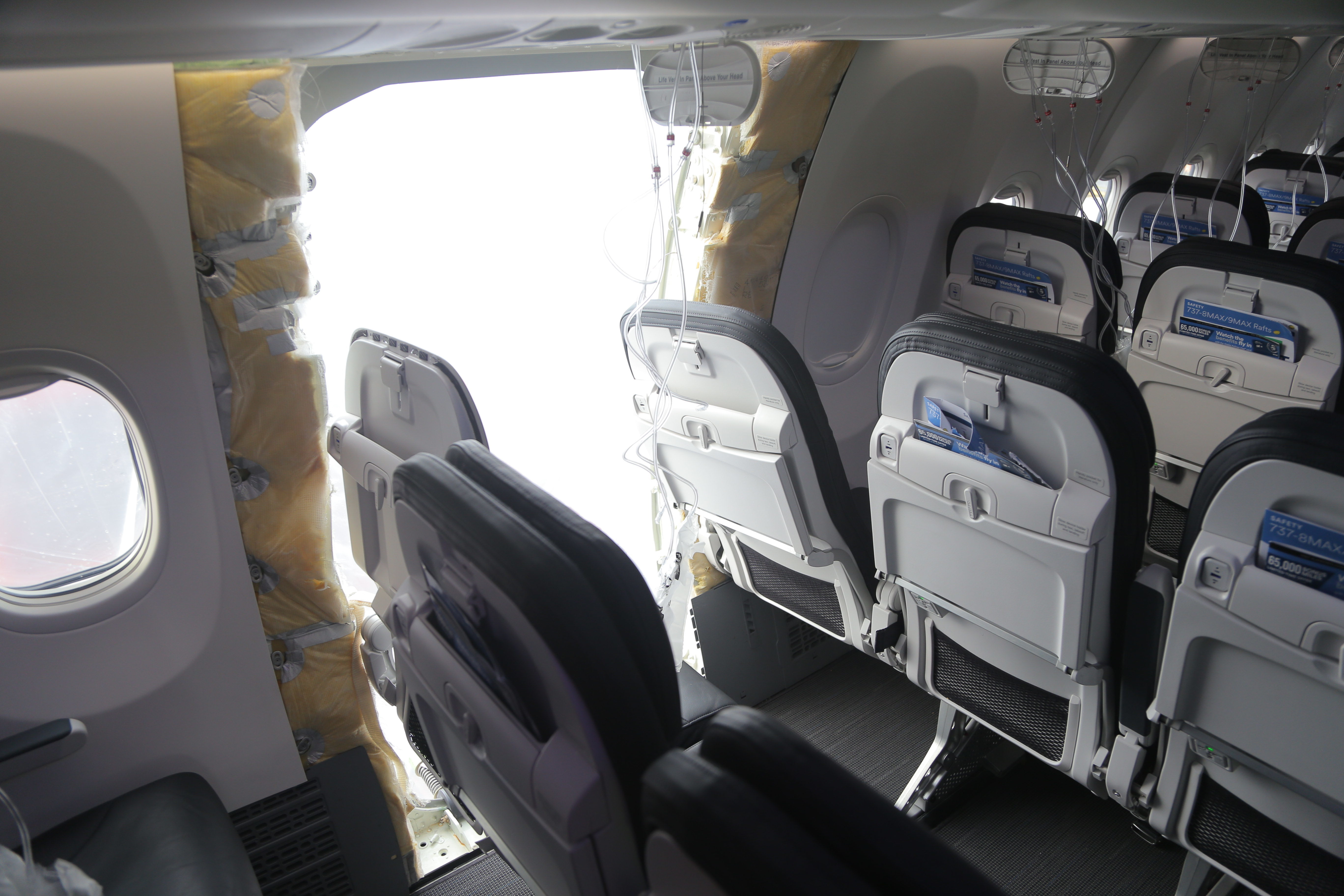
September 13: The FAA fines Boeing for safety violations, including when a plug door fell off midflight.

- September 13 – The Federal Aviation Administration fines Boeing $3.1 million over safety violations, including when an Alaska Airlines jetliner lost a door plug panel on its fuselage midflight.
- September 14 – 77th Primetime Emmy Awards:
  - At the 2025 Primetime Emmy Awards, The Studio becomes the most-nominated first-year comedy series in the awards' history at 23 nominations, tying The Bear's nominations from last year.
  - For the first time in the awards' history, every nominee for Outstanding Writing for a Comedy Series has at least one woman on the writing team.
  - The Studio wins Outstanding Comedy Series and The Pitt wins Outstanding Drama Series, while Adolescence wins Outstanding Limited or Anthology Series
  - English actor Owen Cooper wins the Primetime Emmy Award for Outstanding Supporting Actor in a Limited or Anthology Series or Movie for his role in Adolescence, becoming the youngest male recipient of an Emmy Award. Meanwhile, Tramell Tillman becomes the first Black male to win the award for Outstanding Supporting Actor in a Drama Series for his work in Severance.
  - The Bob Hope Humanitarian Award is awarded to married actors Ted Danson and Mary Steenburgen in recognition of "a lifetime of philanthropy", marking the first time the award is presented to a couple.
- September 16–18 – The second state visit of President Trump to the United Kingdom takes place.
- September 16
  - Luigi Mangione, accused of killing healthcare CEO Brian Thompson, arrives at New York Supreme Court, his first courtroom appearance in five months. Two murder charges related to acts of terrorism are dismissed by the judge.
  - Five people are wounded in a mass shooting at a homeless encampment near the I-35W & Lake Street Metro station in Minneapolis, Minnesota. Later that same day, eight people are injured in a shooting at another homeless encampment. Police say they are investigating a possible connection between the shootings.
  - President Trump files a $15 billion defamation lawsuit against the newspaper The New York Times after the paper published articles and a book alleging that part of The Trump Organization's wealth was acquired through fraud.
  - The Trump Administration reaches an agreement with the Xi Jinping Administration to allow TikTok to continue operating in the US.
  - Recreational cannabis sales begin in Minnesota.
- September 17
  - The Federal Reserve lowers its benchmark interest rate by 0.25 percentage points, to between 4% and 4.25%, down from its prior range of 4.25% to 4.5%, marking its first cut since December 2024.
  - ABC suspends Jimmy Kimmel Live! indefinitely following comments Jimmy Kimmel made about Charlie Kirk's suspected assassin on his show two days prior.
- September 18
  - Trump announces that he will designate the Antifa ideology as a terrorist organization with an executive order on September 22.
  - Returning from the UK aboard Air Force One, Trump tells reporters that the FCC should revoke the licenses of TV networks that cover him negatively.
- September 19 – The Senate confirms Mike Waltz as the Ambassador to the United Nations in a vote of 47–43.
- September 20 – It is reported that Tom Homan, President Trump's border czar, accepted $50,000 from an undercover FBI agent.
- September 21 – A memorial service for conservative political activist Charlie Kirk is held at State Farm Stadium in Glendale, Arizona, attended by over 90,000 people.
- September 22
  - Suspension of Jimmy Kimmel Live!: The Walt Disney Company reverses the earlier decision to indefinitely suspend Jimmy Kimmel Live! by announcing that the late-night talk show will be restored to the airwaves after immense backlash.
  - Five teenagers are wounded in a shooting at an apartment building in El Paso, Texas.
- September 23
  - President Trump criticises the United Nations and countries around the world during a nearly hour-long speech at the UN General Assembly.
  - The Secret Service is reported to have tracked down and disabled a network of 300 SIM servers and 100,000 SIM cards that could have been used to disrupt communications in New York, New Jersey and Connecticut.

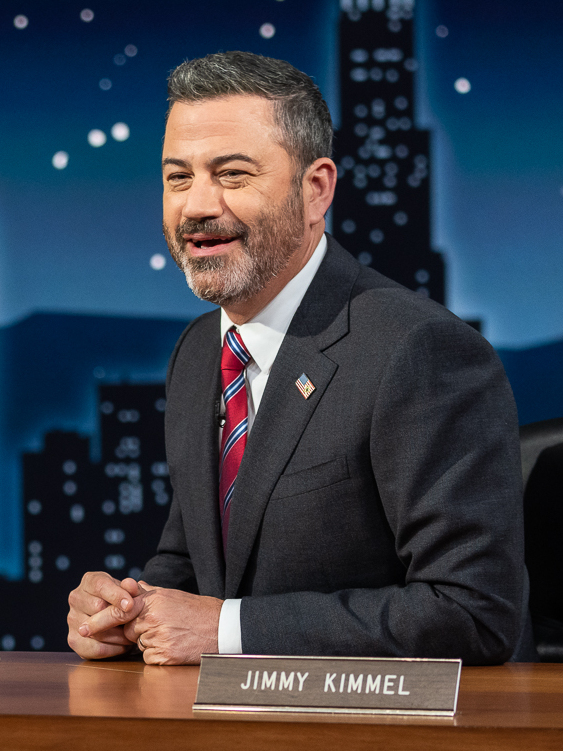
September 17–22: Jimmy Kimmel's late-night talk show Jimmy Kimmel Live! is suspended by ABC following criticism from conservatives, but is released five days later.

- September 24 – 2025 Dallas ICE facility shooting: Three detainees are shot at an ICE field office in Dallas. The shooter dies by suicide.
- September 25
  - Parts of Louisiana, Alabama, and Mississippi experience 911 outages. AT&T reports the outages were caused by fiber cuts made by "third-parties".
  - Former FBI Director James Comey is indicted by a grand jury on charges of giving false statements and obstruction of a congressional proceeding.
- September 26 – Elon Musk, Peter Thiel, Steve Bannon, and Prince Andrew of the British royal family are named in the latest batch of Epstein files.
- September 27
  - President Trump orders the deployment of US troops to Portland, Oregon, which he describes as "war ravaged" and "under siege from attack by Antifa, and other domestic terrorists." He authorizes the use of "full force" if needed.
  - 2025 Southport shooting: Three people are killed and five injured in a mass shooting at a dockside restaurant in Southport, North Carolina. The suspected shooter is taken into custody by the Coast Guard.
- September 28 – Grand Blanc Township church attack: Four people are killed and eight others are wounded in a mass shooting at a Church of Jesus Christ of Latter Day Saints meeting house in Grand Blanc Township, Michigan. The building is also set on fire after a car was driven into the church. The perpetrator is shot dead by responding police.
- September 29 – Video game company Electronic Arts agrees to a $55 billion acquisition by private equity firm Silver Lake, Saudi Arabia's PIF, and Affinity Partners. The deal, reportedly the largest leveraged buyout in history, is to close by Q1 2027.
- September 30
  - AOL ends its dial-up Internet after 30 years of the service.
  - President Trump and Secretary of Defense Pete Hegseth address an audience of nearly 800 U.S. generals and admirals at Marine Corps Base Quantico, Virginia, with both men delivering politically charged remarks.

=== October ===
- October 1
  - 2025 United States federal government shutdown: A shutdown of the federal government begins, the first since 2018, after senators fail to agree on a last-minute funding bill. It lasts until November 12, making it the longest federal government shutdown in U.S. History.
  - Part of a 17-storey residential building in the Bronx area of New York collapses, in what the fire department calls a "major emergency". No injuries are reported.
  - According to Forbes, Elon Musk becomes the first person in history to exceed a net worth of half a trillion dollars, briefly reaching the milestone before slipping back down to $499bn.
  - Two people are critically injured when two CRJ-900 jets, one operated by Delta Air Lines and the other by Endeavor Air, collide on a runway at LaGuardia Airport in New York City.
- October 2
  - Texas megachurch pastor Robert Morris pleads guilty to child sex abuse and is given a 10-year prison sentence, but will serve only six months in an Oklahoma jail.
  - A major fire breaks out at the Chevron Refinery in El Segundo, California.

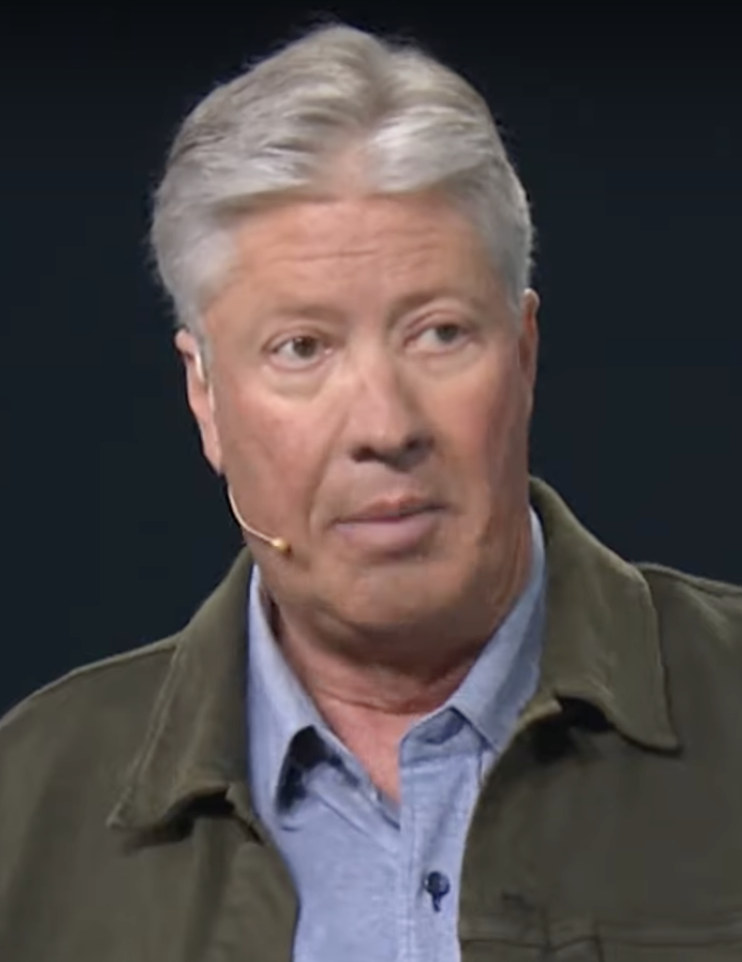
October 2: Texas megachurch pastor Robert Morris, founder of the Gateway Church, pleads guilty to child sex abuse.

- October 3 – Rapper and music industry mogul Sean Combs is sentenced to 50 months in prison (with time served) and given a $500,000 fine after being convicted on prostitution-related charges involving his two ex-girlfriends.
- October 4 – The house of Diane Goodstein, a South Carolina Circuit Court judge recently criticised by the Trump administration, is burned down. Three members of her family, including her husband, former Democratic state senator Arnold Goodstein, and their son, are hospitalized with serious injuries.
- October 5 – President Trump expresses frustration about a ruling by District Court Judge Karin Immergut, whom he appointed during his first term, preventing him from deploying troops to Portland, Oregon.
- October 6
  - The Supreme Court rejects an appeal by Ghislaine Maxwell against her sex-trafficking conviction, meaning her 20-year prison sentence will remain in place, unless a presidential pardon is made.
  - A medical helicopter crashes onto U.S. Route 50 in Sacramento, California, injuring the pilot and two workers on board.
- October 7 – Warrantless arrests by ICE in the Chicago area are ruled unlawful by a federal judge.
- October 8 – Trump announces that Israel and Hamas have reached an agreement and signed the first phase of a peace deal. Under this deal, all remaining hostages are to be released in exchange for 2,000 Palestinian prisoners, including 250 serving life sentences, within 72 hours. Israel will also withdraw its forces to pre-designated lines within the Gaza Strip.
- October 9 – Attorney General of New York Letitia James is indicted on mortgage fraud charges in federal court in Virginia.
- October 10
  - Sixteen people are killed, and several others injured, after a huge blast at a military explosives facility in Tennessee.
  - The White House accuses the Nobel Committee of placing "politics over peace" for awarding the Nobel Peace Prize to Venezuelan pro-democracy activist María Machado, instead of President Trump.
  - Six people are killed in a mass shooting at a homecoming event in Leland, Mississippi.
- October 11 – About 700 employees are reinstated at the Department of Health and Human Services reportedly after they were fired in error.
- October 12 – Four people are killed in a mass shooting at a bar on St. Helena Island in South Carolina.
- October 13 – Andrew Giuliani, director of the FIFA World Cup 2026 Task Force, announces a drone security system for the 2028 Olympics and the 250th anniversary of the US.
- October 14
  - Politico publishes thousands of leaked Telegram messages, revealing young GOP leaders joking about gas chambers, slavery and rape.
  - The retirement (end-of-life) of Microsoft's Windows 10 operating system occurs on this date. Users will either have to install Windows 11 or use an alternative operating system from Microsoft to receive security updates. However, third-party programs and LTSC will continue to support it.
- October 15 – Following a series of deadly U.S. strikes on alleged drug-smuggling boats in the Caribbean, Trump confirms that the CIA is conducting covert operations in Venezuela.

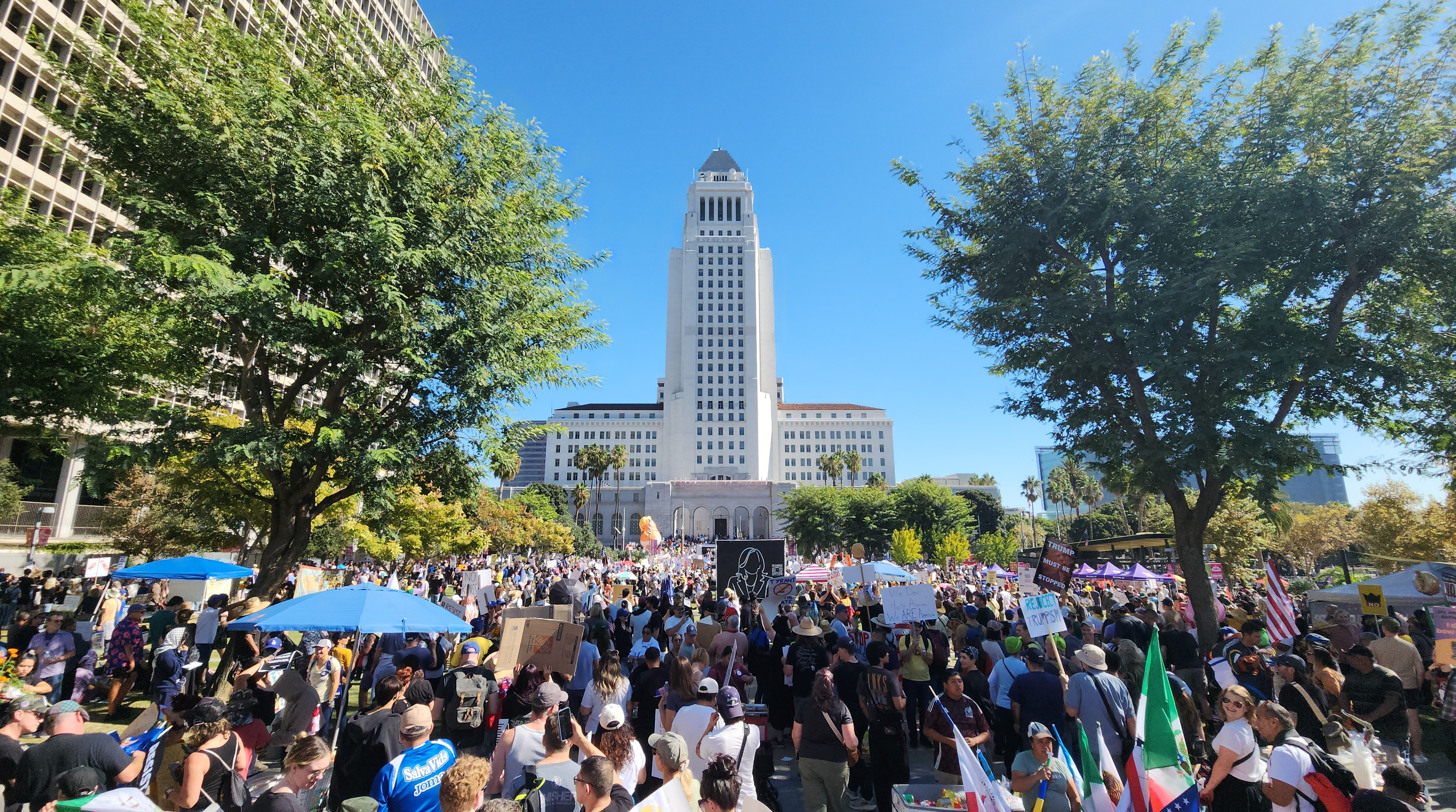
October 18: No Kings protests occur across the country; image shows crowds in Los Angeles, California.

- October 16 - The second phase of the Skyline rapid transit in Honolulu, Hawaii opens for service.
- October 17
  - Former representative George Santos, who had been serving a seven-year prison sentence for fraud and identity theft, has his sentence commuted by President Trump to three months, allowing his immediate release.
  - The National Constitution Center awards the 2025 Liberty Medal to the musical play Hamilton and historian Ron Chernow for writing Alexander Hamilton's biography, which inspired the play.
- October 18 – No Kings protests are held in thousands of locations around the country, against Donald Trump's policies and actions during his second presidency.
- October 20
  - At least three people are wounded in a shooting outside a residential hall at Oklahoma State University in Stillwater, Oklahoma.
  - Demolition begins on the White House's East Wing to accommodate the $250m ballroom planned by the Trump administration.
- October 22 – Secretary of Defense Pete Hegseth announces another strike on a suspected drug smuggling vessel in the Pacific Ocean, killing three people.
- October 23 – Trump pardons Changpeng Zhao, the co-founder and former CEO of Binance, the world's largest cryptocurrency exchange, who served four months in prison for money laundering.
- October 23 – The remains of Eliza Monroe Hay, daughter of 5th president James Monroe, are returned to the United States and buried near her father 185 years after she died in Paris, France.
- October 24
  - Target announces it will layoff 1,800 corporate positions, cutting 8% of its global workforce.
  - Pentagon spokesman Sean Parnell announces that the USS Gerald R Ford carrier will deploy to the Caribbean, alongside several destroyers and a submarine, to "enhance and augment existing capabilities to disrupt narcotics trafficking and degrade and dismantle transnational criminal organisations."
  - The Trump administration imposes sanctions on Colombian president Gustavo Petro, his wife Verónica Alcocer, his son Nicolás, and Interior Minister Armando Benedetti, accusing them of involvement in the global drug trade amid worsening relations between both countries.
- October 25 – Trump announces an increase in U.S. tariffs on Canada by 10% in retaliation for an anti-tariff advertisement sponsored by the Ontario government.
- October 26 – President Trump participates in the signing ceremony of a Cambodia–Thailand Peace Deal with Cambodian Prime Minister Hun Manet and Thai Prime Minister Anutin Charnvirakul.
- October 27 – Public utility companies American Water Works and Essential Utilities announce a merger in an all-stock deal.
- October 28 – The United States and Japan sign a Memorandum of Cooperation to expand shipbuilding capacity, along with agreements on next-generation nuclear power reactors and rare earth materials.
- October 29
  - Chipmaker Nvidia becomes the first company to reach a market valuation of $5 trillion, amid the ongoing AI boom.
  - Trump orders the Defense Department to resume nuclear testing for the first time since 1992.
  - Following talks with Chinese leader Xi Jinping in South Korea, Trump lowers import tariffs on China "effective immediately" and says Beijing will give the US better access to rare earths.
- October 30
  - The Trump administration announces a 95% reduction in the number of refugees allowed to enter the US. The previous limit of 125,000 is cut to 7,500 and gives priority to white South Africans.
  - The Senate passes a bill by 51–47 votes to nullify Trump's global tariffs on more than 100 nations, although the measure was expected to stall in the House.
  - The Heritage Foundation publicly supports Tucker Carlson for having white nationalist political commentator Nick Fuentes onto his podcast. The Heritage Foundation's defense of Carlson ignited a debate about antisemitism among conservatives. Republicans including Ted Cruz and Mitch McConnell condemned the Heritage Foundation's defense of Tucker Carlson.
- October 31 – Trump announces that he will designate Nigeria as a "country of particular concern" in response to reports of recent atrocities against Christians by Islamic extremists.

=== November ===
- November 1
  - Almost 42 million Americans using the Supplemental Nutrition Assistance Program fear they will not be able to access funds starting November 1, due to the shutdown of the government.
  - The Los Angeles Dodgers defeat the Toronto Blue Jays to win the 2025 World Series, their ninth overall World Series title and the first consecutive World Series title since the 2000 New York Yankees.
- November 3 – IRS official Cynthia Noe tells state comptrollers who participate in the IRS Direct File program that it will not be available in the 2026 filing season.
- November 4
  - 2025 United States federal government shutdown: The federal government shutdown becomes the longest shutdown in American history following a failed 14th vote by the U.S. Senate, surpassing the 2018–2019 shutdown that occurred during President Donald Trump's first term.
  - UPS Airlines Flight 2976: Fourteen people are killed and 15 injured when a UPS cargo plane crashes near Louisville Muhammad Ali International Airport in Kentucky.
  - 2025 United States elections: Off-year elections are held, including one special election to a vacancy in the federal House of Representatives, two elections for the governors of Virginia and New Jersey, the next mayor of New York City, and various local elections.
    - Abigail Spanberger is elected as the governor of Virginia to become the state's first female governor.
    - Zohran Mamdani, 34, wins the New York City mayoral race, becoming the city's first Muslim and South Asian mayor and its youngest leader in over a century.
- November 5 – After a court directive, the USDA announces that SNAP benefits will be issued for November 2025 but beneficiaries of the program will only receive up to 65% of their benefits.
- November 6 – Nancy Pelosi announces that she will retire in 2027, after serving for 40 years in the House of Representatives.
- November 7 – DHS secretary Kristi Noem and Corey Lewandowski reportedly attempt to purchase 10 Boeing 737 aircraft from Spirit airlines for deportations and personal use.
- November 8 – President Trump shares an image on Truth Social appearing to propose the length of mortgages be increased to 50 years.
- November 9
  - Trump issues pardons for Rudy Giuliani, Sidney Powell and 75 others involved in the 2020 fake elector scheme.
  - Five people are wounded, including one seriously, in a mass shooting outside a supermarket in San Francisco, California.
- November 10
  - The Senate reaches a deal to end the government shutdown after 41 days. The bill passes 60–40 in the Senate.
  - The Supreme Court rejects an appeal by Kim Davis to overturn Obergefell v. Hodges, the landmark 2015 ruling that legalised same-sex marriage nationwide.
  - Twenty people are injured, including three critically, and hospitalized when a bus carrying mostly teenagers overturns on SR 330 near Running Springs, California.

November 10: The government shutdown ends following a Senate vote, also ending the SNAP shutdown. (Image shows SNAP recipients by US county)

- November 12
  - Newly released emails provided by the Jeffrey Epstein estate show that "Trump knew about the girls" being abused by Epstein and "spent hours" with one of the victims.
  - The Philadelphia Mint halts the production of the penny for circulation, but it remains in circulation and legal tender.
  - The longest government shutdown in US history ends after 43 days, with a new spending bill signed into law.
- November 13 – The ESCAPADE mission is launched by NASA, using Blue Origin's partially reusable New Glenn rocket. Two spacecraft, known as Blue and Gold, are scheduled to arrive at Mars in 2026.
- November 14 – President Trump distances himself from former ally Representative Marjorie Taylor Greene, and calls her a lunatic on Truth Social, after she backed the releasing of the Epstein files.
- November 15 – After released personal emails of Jeffrey Epstein caused speculation that President Trump and prior President Bill Clinton once engaged in inappropriate conduct, Epstein's brother Mark issues a statement that the exchange was a joke and not about Clinton.
- November 16 – While speaking on Fox News, Treasury Secretary Scott Bessent raises doubt over the ability to issue President Trump's announced tariff rebate checks.
- November 17
  - The Federal Aviation Administration lifts all restrictions on commercial flights that were imposed during the government shutdown.
  - Nicaragua–United States relations: The government imposes visa restrictions and revokes some existing visas for Nicaraguans, including owners of transportation and travel companies, whom it accuses of facilitating illegal immigration to the United States.
  - 2025 Chicago train attack: 26-year-old Bethany MaGee is set on fire in an arson attack on Chicago's Blue Line, leaving her in critical condition. A 50-year-old male suspect is arrested.
- November 18
  - Immigration raids and arrests in the second Trump presidency: The Justice Department reports that over 97% of undocumented immigrants arrested in ICE raids in Operation Midway Blitz in Chicago, Illinois, had no criminal records.
  - The House votes 427–1 to compel the Justice Department to release all of its Jeffrey Epstein files. The Senate gives unanimous consent to pass it upon its arrival, sending the bill to Trump for his signature.
  - A jet fuel spill near Everett, Washington, temporarily shuts down the Olympic pipeline, the Pacific Northwest's primary oil pipeline. Washington governor Bob Ferguson issues an emergency proclamation as the shutdown disrupted jet fuel transportation to Seattle-Tacoma International Airport.
  - The interior department adds potash and phosphate to its critical minerals list.
- November 19
  - Trump signs a bill requiring the Justice Department to release its files on Jeffrey Epstein within 30 days.
  - Ford Motor Co. issues a recall for over 200,000 Bronco and Bronco Sport cars due to a possible dashboard failure.
  - The 2025 National Book Awards are held in New York City.
- November 20 – President Trump posts to Truth Social calling for Democratic lawmakers to be arrested and put on trial after making a video urging US service members and the intelligence community to refrain from orders if they broke the law.
- November 21 – Marjorie Taylor Greene announces her resignation from the House of Representatives effective January 5, 2026, amid a feud with President Trump.
- November 22 – The US Court of Appeals for the DC circuit puts a hold on a ruling by a lower judge and blocks the DHS from enforcing policies that expose migrants to the risk of rapid deportations.

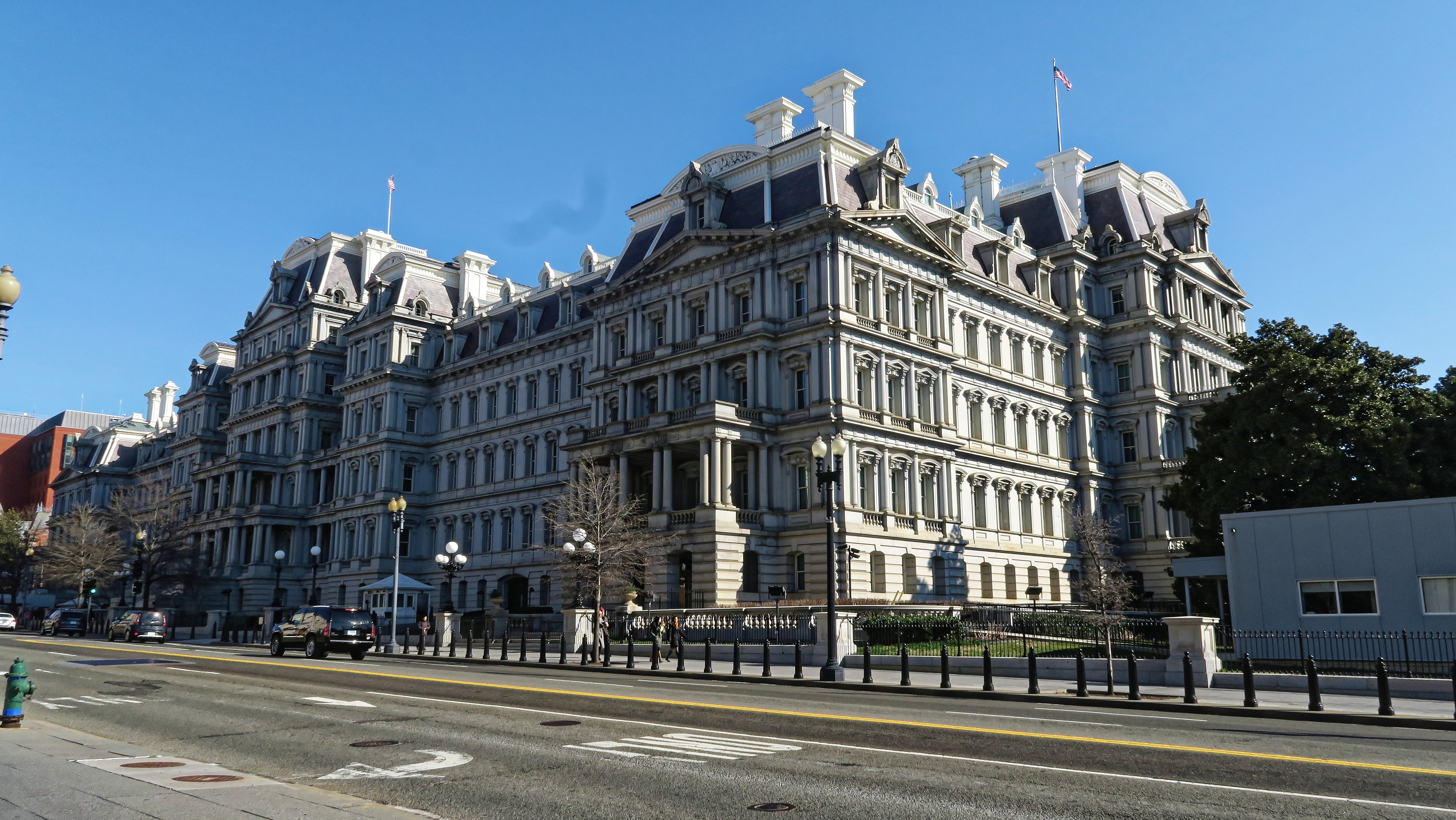
November 23: The Department of Government Efficiency (DOGE) is reportedly shut down eight months ahead of schedule.

- November 23 – The Department of Government Efficiency (DOGE) is reported to have been shut down, eight months ahead of schedule, though President Trump and his administration dispute this.
- November 24 – A federal judge dismisses cases against ex-FBI boss James Comey and NY attorney general Letitia James.
- November 25 – The Department of Interior announces an entrance fee increase for all international visitors to national parks, commemorative annual passes featuring Donald Trump and "resident-only patriotic fee-free days for 2026" including Trump's birthday.
- November 26
  - A Georgia prosecutor officially drops the racketeering case against President Trump and others for attempting to overturn the 2020 presidential election.
  - The Washington state government fines Regence Blue Shield $550,000 for failing to provide mental health coverage comparable to its medical or surgical coverage.
  - Washington, D.C., shooting: Two National Guardsmen are shot a few blocks away from the White House in Washington DC. One of the victims, 20-year-old Sarah Beckstrom, succumbs to her injuries the following day, while the other, 24-year-old Andrew Wolfe, is left "fighting for his life" in hospital. A suspect, 29-year-old Rahmanullah Lakanwal, is taken into custody.
- November 27 – Trump announces that the US will "permanently pause migration" from all "third world countries".
- November 28 – U.S. officials and legal experts raise accusations that Defense Secretary Pete Hegseth may have committed war crimes by ordering a follow-up strike to kill survivors of a September 2 strike on a suspected drug–smuggling boat in the Caribbean, after the first missile attack reportedly left two people clinging to the wreckage.
- November 29 – 2025 Stockton shooting: Four people are killed and eleven others injured in a mass shooting during a family gathering at a banquet hall in Stockton, California.
- November 30 – President Trump announces via Truth Social that he would pardon former Honduran President Juan Orlando Hernandez.

=== December ===
- December 1 – White House press secretary Karoline Leavitt confirms that Defense Secretary Pete Hegseth had authorized a follow up second strike on an alleged drug boat in the Caribbean in September 2025. The second strike was ordered after two apparent survivors were identified in the wreckage.
- December 2
  - 2025 Tennessee's 7th congressional district special election: Republican Matt Van Epps wins election to the 7th congressional district.
  - Honduras–United States relations: Trump pardons former Honduran president Juan Orlando Hernández from his conviction of aiding large-scale cocaine trafficking and releases him from a prison in Preston County, West Virginia.
  - Costco joins several other companies in suing the Trump administration over its tariffs, seeking refunds in the event that the Supreme Court finds them illegal.
  - Immigration policy: The Trump administration pauses immigration applications, including requests for green cards, for people from 19 countries: Afghanistan, Chad, Eritrea, Equatorial Guinea, Haiti, Iran, Libya, Myanmar, Republic of Congo, Somalia, Sudan, Yemen. They also restrict access for people from seven other countries: Burundi, Cuba, Laos, Sierra Leone, Togo, Turkmenistan, and Venezuela.
  - The Department of Justice files a lawsuit against the Secretary of State for Washington over his refusal to provide personal information from the state's voter polls, which are protected under state law.
- December 3
  - The DHS begins increased operations in New Orleans and Minneapolis. The operation in New Orleans is dubbed "Swamp Sweep".
  - School shootings: A student is injured and another is arrested in a school shooting at Phillip & Sala Burton High School in San Francisco, California.
- December 4 – The FBI arrests a Virginia man suspected of planting pipe bombs outside the DNC and RNC buildings in Washington, D.C. on January 5, 2021.

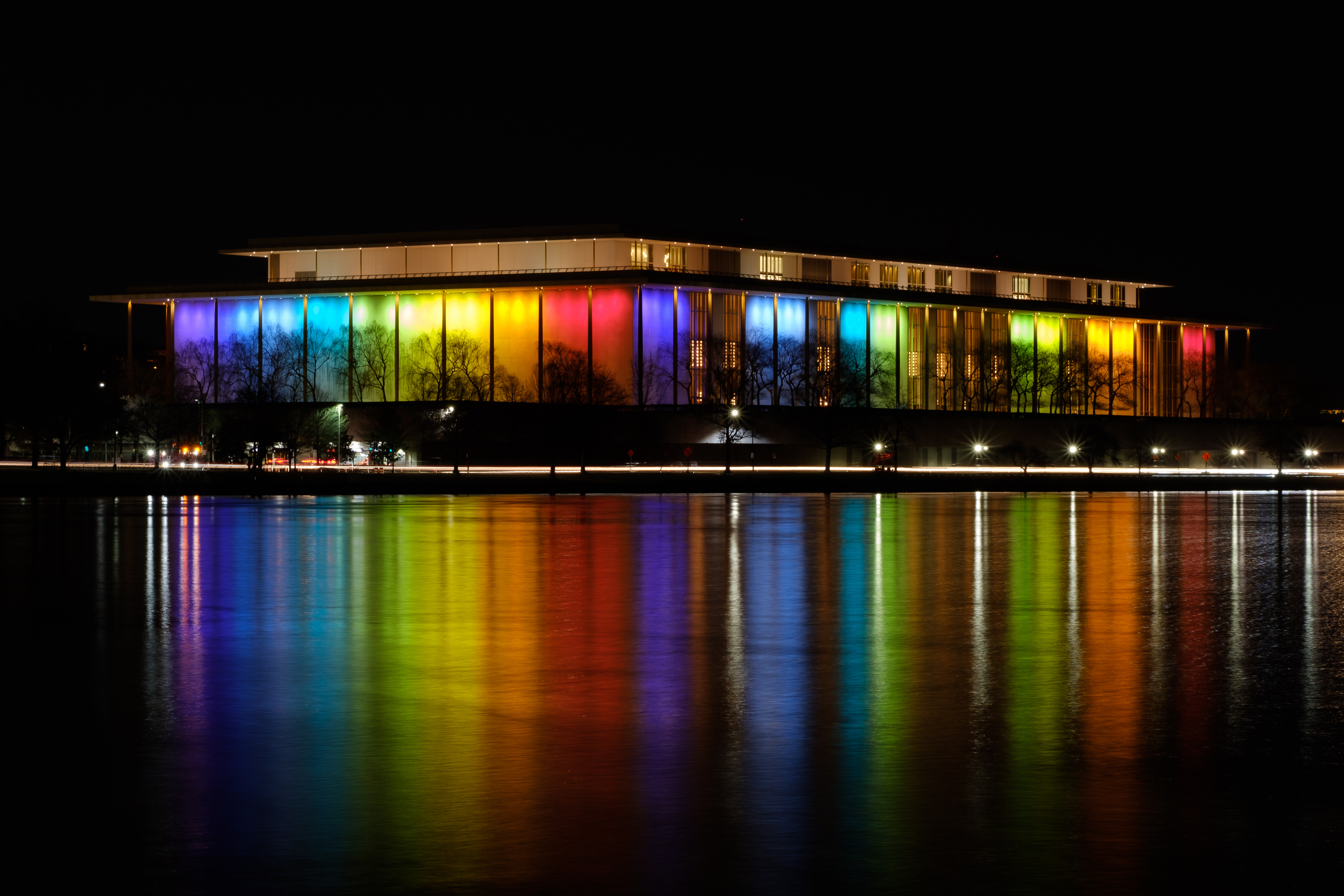
December 5: The FIFA World Cup draw is held at the Kennedy Center (pictured).

- December 5
  - Netflix agrees to buy the film and streaming businesses of Warner Bros. Discovery for $72B, outbidding rivals Comcast and Paramount Skydance.
  - The Institute of Museum and Library Services reinstates all grants previously terminated by the Trump administration, restoring funding to public libraries and museums.
  - The 2026 FIFA World Cup draw is hosted at the Kennedy Center.
  - Vaccination policy: The West Coast Health Alliance constituting states California, Hawaii, Oregon, and Washington recommends the Hepatitis B vaccine for all newborn babies, going against CDC policy that only recommends it to babies of mothers who test positive for the virus.
- December 6 – In MLS Cup 2025, the Inter Miami CF beat the Vancouver Whitecaps FC, 3–1, to clinch their first MLS Cup title, with two assists by Lionel Messi, who was named the match's most valuable player.
- December 8 – Texas formally launches its Strategic Bitcoin Reserve with an initial $5 million investment in Bitcoin.
- December 9
  - Florida governor Ron DeSantis designates the Council on American-Islamic Relations, a Muslim civil rights and advocacy group, as a foreign terrorist organization.
  - Catholic Church sexual abuse cases: Cardinal Timothy Dolan of the Roman Catholic Archdiocese of New York announces the archdiocese will set up a $300 million fund to compensate victims of sexual abuse who have sued the church.
  - Democrat Eric Gisler wins the Georgia State House District 121 special election.
- December 10
  - TIME magazine names Las Vegas Aces player A'ja Wilson as Athlete of the Year.
  - George Floyd protests in Ohio: The city of Cincinnati, Ohio, grants an $8.1 million settlement to protesters arrested by police during Black Lives Matter protests in 2020.
  - Trump announces the United States has seized an oil tanker off the coast of Venezuela.
- December 11
  - The Indiana Senate rejects a measure to pass the redistricting bill for Indiana.
  - Tyler Robinson, the man accused of killing conservative activist Charlie Kirk at a Utah campus in September makes his first in-person court appearance.
- December 12
  - A further 19 photographs from the estate of Jeffrey Epstein are released by Democrats on the House Oversight Committee. Among those pictured are President Donald Trump, former President Bill Clinton, Steve Bannon, Bill Gates, Woody Allen, Andrew Mountbatten-Windsor and Richard Branson.
  - Brian Fennessy is named the chief of the newly created United States Wildland Fire Service after previously serving as the chief of the Orange County Fire Authority.
- December 13
  - Two US soldiers and a US civilian interpreter are reported killed in Syria in an ambush by an Islamic State (IS) gunman.
  - Brown University shooting: Two students are killed and nine injured by a gunman at Brown University in Rhode Island.
  - John Cena retires from professional wrestling at WWE Saturday Night's Main Event XLII in Washington, D.C., officially ending his 26-year wrestling career.
- December 14 – Director Rob Reiner and his wife, Michele Singer Reiner, are found dead in their L.A. home with multiple stab wounds. Their son, 32-year-old Nick, is arrested later in the day and held on a $4 million bail.
- December 15 – Five people from the far-left Turtle Island Liberation Front are arrested for allegedly plotting a series of bombings across southern California on New Year's Eve.
- December 16 – Eleven firefighters and two other people are injured in a house fire and subsequent explosion in Salisbury, North Carolina.
- December 17 – In a 67–30 Senate vote, Jared Isaacman is confirmed as the next NASA administrator.
- December 18
  - Taiwan–United States relations: The United States approves an $11.1 billion arms sale to Taiwan, including medium-range ballistic missiles, drones, and howitzers, the largest arms deal in the history of bilateral relations between the two countries.
  - Five days after the Brown University shooting, the suspect is found dead inside a New Hampshire storage facility. Authorities say the shooting may be connected to the December 15 fatal shooting of MIT professor Nuno Loureiro at his home in Brookline, Massachusetts.
  - President Donald Trump suspends the green card lottery program in response to the Brown University shooting and murder of Nuno Loureiro. The suspect was a Portuguese national who had been issued a diversity visa in 2017, having originally entered the United States with a student visa to study at Brown University in 2000.
- December 19
  - The Justice Department releases a heavily redacted tranche of the so-called Epstein files.
  - The LDS Church repatriates a large rock with petroglyphs to the Northwestern Band of the Shoshone Nation in Tremonton, Utah.
- December 21–22
  - Inside CECOT, a 60 Minutes exposé reporting the severe conditions faced by detainees deported from the U.S. at the Terrorism Confinement Center in El Salvador, is pulled from release on the order of CBS editor-in-chief Bari Weiss over concerns that it indicates bias to the American public and unfairly misrepresents the actions and policies of the Trump administration. The piece is unintentionally published online by a Canadian license-holder the following day, quickly going viral and spreading across the internet despite claims of copyright infringement by the network.
- December 23 – The Justice Department releases more than 11,000 files related to the Epstein investigation, the largest batch to date. The files show that Donald Trump travelled on Epstein's private jet "many more times than previously has been reported".
- December 24 – 2025 deployment of federal forces: The Supreme Court blocks a request by president Trump to deploy the National Guard to Chicago, Illinois, rendering Operation Midway Blitz illegal.
- December 25 – A player in Arkansas wins the Powerball jackpot for $1.817 billion as the first Christmas win since 2013.
- December 29
  - Mountain West Food Group orders a recall of 3,000 lbs of ground beef in six states–California, Colorado, Idaho, Montana, Pennsylvania, and Washington–after discovering possible E. coli contamination.
  - Rescue crews find the bodies of three hikers on a trail at Mount Baldy in California.
- December 30
  - Alicia Johnson becomes the first Black woman to be elected to the Georgia Public Service Commission after winning the election for District 2.
  - The Department of Health and Human Services freezes child care payments to all states following accusations of fraud at daycare centers in Minnesota.

== See also ==
- 2025 deaths in the US
- 2025 in American music
- 2025 in American television
- List of American films of 2025
- List of animated feature films of 2025
- 2025–26 NBA season
- 2025–26 NHL season
- 2025 NFL season
- 2025 MLB season
- 2025–26 US network television schedule
