= List of mass shootings in the United States in 2025 =

Mass shootings in the contiguous United States in 2025
Mass shootings in Hawaii in 2025
Mass shootings in Puerto Rico in 2025

This is a list of mass shootings that took place in the United States in 2025. Mass shootings are incidents in which several people are injured or killed due to firearm-related violence; specifically for the purposes of this article, this consists of a total of four or more victims. A total of 420 people were killed and 1,900 people wounded in 425 shootings.

== Definitions ==
Several different inclusion criteria are used; there is no generally accepted definition. Gun Violence Archive, a nonprofit research group that tracks shootings and their characteristics in the United States, defines a mass shooting as an incident in which four or more people, excluding the perpetrator(s), are shot in one location at roughly the same time. The Congressional Research Service provides a definition of four or more killed. The Washington Post and Mother Jones use similar definitions, with the latter acknowledging that their definition "is a conservative measure of the problem", as many shootings with fewer fatalities occur.

A 2019 study of mass shootings published in the journal Injury Epidemiology recommended developing "a standard definition that considers both fatalities and nonfatalities to most appropriately convey the burden of mass shootings on gun violence." The authors of the study further suggested that "the definition of mass shooting should be four or more people, excluding the shooter, who are shot in a single event regardless of the motive, setting or number of deaths."

Definitions generally exclude consideration of the number of persons targeted with lethal intent, perhaps with degraded accuracy from a greater distance, who escape injury from bullets or bullet spall, regardless of injury sustained while evading live gunfire, or medical complications resulting from those injuries (such as infection, concussion, stroke, or PTSD) further down the road.

Definitions of the term "mass shooting"
Organization(s)	Definition
Stanford University MSA Data Project	Three or more shot, excluding the perpetrators, in one incident at one location at roughly the same time, excluding shootings associated with organized crime, gangs, or drug wars.
Gun Violence Archive Vox	Four or more shot, excluding the perpetrators, in one incident in one location at roughly the same time.
ABC News	Four or more shot and killed, excluding the perpetrators, in one incident at one location at roughly the same time.
Mother Jones	Three or more shot and killed, excluding the perpetrators, in one incident at a public place, excluding all shootings the organization considers to be "conventionally motivated," such as all gang violence and armed robberies.
The Washington Post	Four or more shot and killed, excluding the perpetrators, in one incident at a public place.
Congressional Research Service	Four or more shot and killed, excluding the perpetrators, in one incident at a public place, excluding gang-related killings and those done with a profit motive.

Unless a newspaper article or other source for the shooting states the shooting may have involved gang activity, a robbery, organized crime, etc., it is not considered a gang-related, robbery-related, or organized crime-related shooting to be excluded from the list under some of the definitions above.

Shootings that are reported as occurring in a home, at a party, or in an apartment complex with no other information given are considered non-public shootings and are excluded by some of the definitions above that state the shooting occurred "in a public place."

For statistical purposes, armed accomplices are likely to be classified as perpetrators, even if later analysis determines that the accomplice never discharged a firearm. Bystanders struck by bullets fired in self-defense by another bystander would potentially be classified as victims of a mass shooting, while a bystander firing in self-defense who injures or kills another bystander would almost certainly not be classified as a perpetrator. The classification of a bystander struck by police while attempting to take out a believed perpetrator falls into a gray zone.

== List ==
2025 date	Location	State or territory	Dead	Injured	Total	Description
December 31	Round Rock (2)	Texas	0	5	5	A fight during a New Year's Eve party being hosted at an event center escalated into a shooting that wounded five juveniles.
December 31	Anderson (2)	South Carolina	0	4	4	Four people, including at least one teenager, were shot at an event venue rented out for a New Year's Eve party.
December 30	East Los Angeles	California	1	3	4	Four men sitting in a car were fired upon by another group, killing one and wounding three.
December 28	Country Club	California	1	3	4	A group filming a music video outside a taco truck were shot at by another group, killing a teenage boy and wounding three others, including an employee of the taco truck who stepped outside to watch the performance.
December 28	Phoenix (3)	Arizona	1	3	4	Three women and a man were injured in a shooting downtown. One victim died nearly a week later.
December 28	Fort Lauderdale	Florida	0	5	5	Five people were shot outside of a bar downtown in the early morning.
December 28	Chicago (24)	Illinois	1	3	4	Four unidentified suspects approached a car in River North as people were entering it and opened fire, killing a 34-year-old man and critically injuring three others. The suspects fled the scene and are at large.
December 27	Socorro	Texas	1	3	4	A shooting killed one person and injured three others.
December 26	Washington (5)	District of Columbia	0	5	5	Five men were injured in a shooting near the Walter E. Washington Convention Center in the Shaw neighborhood of Northwest D.C.
December 26	San Jose (2)	California	1	3	4	One person was killed and three others were wounded in an early morning shooting at an after-hours business in the O'Brien Tract area.
December 25	Lancaster	California	1	4	5	A shooting killed a sixteen-year-old boy and injured two men and two juveniles.
December 24	Jacksonville	Alabama	0	4	4	Four people were shot at an apartment complex.
December 24	Aurora	Colorado	2	3	5	A shooting at an apartment complex in the Sable Altura Chambers neighborhood killed a teenage boy and a woman and left three others injured.
December 24	Greenwood	Mississippi	2	2	4	A shooting at a Christmas Eve family gathering killed two people and injured two others.
December 24	Chicago (23)	Illinois	1	3	4	Two unidentified male suspects opened fire on a group of people in the city's Englewood neighborhood, killing a man and injured three others.
December 23	Albany	Georgia	1	4	5	A shooting killed a teenage boy and left four other teenagers wounded.
December 20	Oakland	California	0	4	4	Four people were shot in the area of the Millsmont neighborhood.
December 20	Jacksonville (4)	Florida	0	5	5	Five people, including a teenager, were injured in a party shooting after an argument between two groups escalated in the Alderman Park neighborhood.
December 19	Rochester	New York	1 (Note: Including the perpetrator or suspect)	4	5	A man shot a 911 caller and three responding Rochester officers when they responded to a trespassing report. A police officer returned fire and killed the man.
December 15	Baltimore (7)	Maryland	1	4	5	A shooting in the Belair-Edison neighborhood killed a woman and injured four others.
December 14	Cleveland (7)	Ohio	1	3	4	A man was found shot to death outside a bar in the Union–Miles Park neighborhood. Three other men arrived at local hospitals in connection to the shooting shortly thereafter.
December 14	Greenville	North Carolina	0	4	4	A fight in a hookah bar parking lot escalated into a shooting that wounded four people.
December 14	New York City (8)	New York	0	6	6	Six teenagers were shot by two masked gunmen as they stood outside an event venue in the East New York neighborhood of Brooklyn.
December 13	Providence	Rhode Island	3 (Note: A third victim was shot and killed two days after the mass shooting at Brown University)	9	12	2025 Brown University shooting: A former student opened fire in Brown University's engineering school during a review session for final exams, killing two people and injuring nine others. The shooter then traveled to Brookline, Massachusetts where he fatally shot Nuno Loureiro in a separate attack, before taking his own life in Salem, New Hampshire where he was found dead inside a storage facility near the Massachusetts border.
December 10	Newark (3)	New Jersey	2	2	4	Two men were killed and two other men were injured in a suspected targeted shooting at a recording studio in the Clinton Hill neighborhood.
December 8	Stillwater County	Montana	2	2	4	A man is accused of shooting four people, two fatally, west of Absarokee. The man was arrested after crashing his truck into Stillwater River while fleeing the scene.
December 7	San Jose (1)	California	1	3	4	A man was killed and three others were injured in the Willow Glen neighborhood.
December 7	Clearwater	Florida	1	4	5	A man was killed and four other men were injured in a shooting at a sports bar.
December 6	Dallas (9)	Texas	1	4	5	One person was killed and four others were injured in a shooting at an event center.
December 6	Baltimore (6)	Maryland	2	2	4	Two people were killed and two others were injured in an early morning shooting between Carrollton Ridge and Mount Clare neighborhoods of Southwest Baltimore.
December 6	Muskegon	Michigan	2	3	5	A shooting at a property killed two people and injured three others, including a four-year-old child and two critically.
December 5	Union	South Carolina	0	4	4	A shooting at an apartment complex wounded four people, including at least one juvenile. Investigators located a vehicle that showed evidence of gunfire in which there were multiple firearms, cell phones, cash, and narcotics.
December 3	Omaha (4)	Nebraska	1	5	6	A man shot and injured a 61-year-old man in the chest at a grocery store. Police followed the gunman to a gas station, where he fired at officers, striking three, before being killed by police. One officer was also injured by shrapnel in the exchange of gunfire.
November 29	San Joaquin County	California	4	13	17	2025 Stockton shooting: A shooting during a birthday party being held at a banquet hall near Stockton killed four people, three of whom were children, and injured thirteen others. No arrests have been made.
November 24	Dallas (8)	Texas	2	3	5	A man opened fire in the parking lot of a night club in Downtown Dallas, killing another man and injuring three other men before he was fatally shot by responding police officers after pointing a gun towards them.
November 23	Union City	Tennessee	1	6	7	A shooting inside a lounge killed a man and injured six others.
November 22	Phoenix (2)	Arizona	2	2	4	A disagreement between the occupants of two vehicles escalated into a physical confrontation when they pulled into a Lowe's parking lot. A suspect opened fire on the occupants of the other vehicle, killing the male driver and wounding his female passenger and two of the three children who were inside. The woman returned fire, but did not strike the suspect, although they were hospitalized for unrelated health issues after being taken into custody. The following day, one of the injured children died.
November 22	Houston (8)	Texas	1	9	10	A shooting during a dance party being held by a group of trail riders in southwest Houston killed a woman and injured nine other people.
November 21	Chicago (22)	Illinois	0	7	7	Seven teenagers were shot in the Chicago Loop near the Chicago Theatre.
November 16	Jacksonville (3)	Florida	0	4	4	Two juveniles and two adults were shot in the Eastside neighborhood after a fight escalated to a shooting at a teen after-party.
November 15	Clay County	Mississippi	0	5	5	Five people were shot at a bonfire east of Mantee.
November 15	Las Cruces (2)	New Mexico	1	3	4	A shooting during a house party killed a man and injured three others.
November 15	Newark (2)	New Jersey	3	2	5	A 10-year-old and two adults were killed and another child and adult were injured in a shooting in the Weequahic neighborhood.
November 15	Ridgeway Township	Kansas	1	5	6	Officers responded to a domestic violence incident at a residence north of Carbondale where a man opened fire, wounding four officers and his 77-year-old grandfather. The shooter was then shot and killed.
November 8	San Francisco (4)	California	0	5	5	A fight in the area of Outer Richmond led to a shooting which wounded five people, including at least one teenager.
November 7	Wilmington	Delaware	0	5	5	Four men and a woman were shot in the Compton Village neighborhood.
November 2	Los Angeles (7)	California	0	4	4	Four men were shot in the Winnetka neighborhood after another group of men in a car stopped, asked them where they were from, and then opened fire.
November 2	Cincinnati	Ohio	0	4	4	A dispute outside a nightclub in the Over-The-Rhine neighborhood escalated into a shooting which injured four, including the owner's nephew.
November 2	Washington (4)	District of Columbia	0	5	5	Five people were shot in the Gateway neighborhood of northeast DC.
November 2	Elk Grove	California	2	2	4	A man opened fire at a bar following an argument, killing one person and wounding three others. A second person died of his injuries three days later.
November 2	Chicago (21)	Illinois	0	4	4	Four people were shot in the Lake View neighborhood after a man allegedly got out of a pickup truck and opened fire on them.
November 2	Montrose-Ghent	Ohio	1	7	8	Eight people, including several juveniles, were shot at a party being held at an Airbnb rental in Bath Township. A ninth person suffered a leg injury while fleeing the gunfire. Four days later, a critically wounded teenage boy died from his injuries.
November 1	Gretna	Florida	1	4	5	Multiple people are believed to have opened fire during a memorial service for a homicide victim, killing one person and injuring four others.
November 1	Tucson (2)	Arizona	2	2	4	Two teenagers were killed and two others were injured in a shooting during a large house party.
November 1	Sacramento	California	0	4	4	Four people were shot at an "illegal" Halloween party in the Natomas Creek neighborhood.
November 1	New Haven	Connecticut	1	3	4	Four people were shot, one fatally, when two people began shooting at each other outside a Dunkin' store. Police said all four of the victims were bystanders.
October 31	San Antonio (3)	Texas	0	4	4	Four teenagers were shot during a Halloween party at a home in the Central Los Angeles Heights neighborhood.
October 31	Oklahoma City (2)	Oklahoma	0	5	5	Five juveniles were shot and injured at a Halloween party.
October 29	Sabana Seca	Puerto Rico	2	3	5	Two men were shot and killed outside a barber shop after reportedly having been followed from Carolina. Three people inside a nearby music academy were also injured.
October 26	Nashville (3)	Tennessee	0	4	4	At least one person opened fire on the occupants of two vehicles in the area of McFerrin Park and Cleveland Park, resulting in four people being shot. At least one of the victims returned fire and one of the shot at vehicles crashed.
October 26	Pasco	Washington	0	5	5	A shooting at a house party stemming from an earlier altercation wounded five people.
October 26	Houston (7)	Texas	1	3	4	One person was killed and three others were injured in a shooting in the Gulfton neighborhood.
October 25	Lincoln University	Pennsylvania	1	6	7	A shooting during homecoming festivities at Lincoln University killed a person and injured six others during a tailgate and yardfest event near the school's football field.
October 25	Robeson County	North Carolina	2	11	13	Thirteen people were shot at a large party in a rural area near Maxton. Two people were killed and several others were critically injured.
October 24	Washington (3)	District of Columbia	0	5	5	Five people, including a teenager, were shot on the campus of Howard University during homecoming activities. None of the victims were students of the school, but one of the victims was a student of Morgan State University, whose football team was scheduled to play Howard University the following day.
October 20	Dover (2)	Delaware	0	4	4	Four men were injured in a late-evening drive-by shooting in Dover.
October 20	Buena Park	California	0	4	4	Three juveniles and an adult were shot inside a vehicle overnight.
October 19	Pinson	Alabama	1	3	4	Four people, including two teenagers, are suspected to have been shot by a man at a bonfire after a fight over a girl escalated into a shooting. A teenage girl suffered severe injuries that left her brain dead, and two days later she was taken off life support.
October 19	Dallas (7)	Texas	0	4	4	Four people were injured in Old East Dallas when a person returned to a gathering they had been asked to leave and opened fire.
October 18	Cleveland (6)	Ohio	2	2	4	Two men were killed and two other men were injured from an early morning shooting at a Sunoco gas station in the Slavic Village neighborhood.
October 18	Gautier	Mississippi	1	3	4	Three teenagers, one of whom died, and a woman were shot at an apartment complex.
October 17	Bethany	Oklahoma	0	4	4	A fight at an apartment complex escalated into a shooting that wounded four.
October 17	West Norriton Township	Pennsylvania	0	6	6	A shooting involving rival motorcycle gangs outside of a Wawa convenience store left six people injured.
October 17	Henderson County	Texas	4	2	6	A man shot five people, three fatally, at a home south of Mabank before driving into a Buc-ee's in Ennis and pinning a woman against a display. After coming to a stop, the man mortally wounded himself.
October 17	Chicago (20)	Illinois	0	4	4	Three men and a woman were shot in a drive-by shooting in the Gold Coast area.
October 12	Wichita	Kansas	0	4	4	Three men and a woman were shot as they sat in a vehicle together at an intersection in the Hilltop neighborhood.
October 12	Dallas (6)	Texas	1	4	5	An early morning shooting at a strip mall in East Dallas killed a man and wounded four others.
October 12	Anderson (1)	South Carolina	2	3	5	Two security guards were killed and three others were injured when a fight at a bar escalated into a shooting during the early morning.
October 12	Beaufort County	South Carolina	4 (Note: Including at least one of the perpetrators)	15	19	2025 Saint Helena Island shooting: Four people were killed and 15 others, four critically, were injured in a shooting at a bar on Saint Helena Island in the early morning hours. It was later determined that one of the shooters was among the dead, and that a suspect was also injured.
October 11	Leland	Mississippi	7	12	19	2025 Leland shooting: Following a homecoming high school football game, a shooting during a gathering in downtown Leland killed seven people and injured 12 others. Six others suffered non-gunshot injuries.
October 9	Youngstown	Ohio	0	4	4	Four people, including two teenagers, and a dog were shot in the Warren neighborhood.
October 8	St. Louis (4)	Missouri	1	4	5	A shooting during a balloon release for a homicide victim in the Hamilton Heights neighborhood killed a man and injured four other men.
October 7	Minneapolis (8)	Minnesota	1	3	4	An altercation inside a bar in the Gateway District area of Downtown West escalated into a shooting that killed a man and injured three others.
October 5	Fort Worth	Texas	1	5	6	Multiple people opened fire inside a nightclub in the Cultural District, killing a man who was a known gang member, and injuring five others before fleeing.
October 5	Nashville (2)	Tennessee	0	4	4	Four people were injured in a shooting at an apartment complex in the Talbot's Corner area of East Nashville.
October 4	Mobile (3)	Alabama	1	4	5	An altercation in the parking lot of a nightclub in the Navco area escalated into a shooting which killed a man and wounded four others. The slain man is believed to have opened fire first, prompting another man to return fire, killing him.
October 4	Montgomery	Alabama	2	12	14	2025 Montgomery shooting: Two people, including a teenager, were killed and 12 others were injured when two groups of people opened fire on each other in a crowd in Downtown Montgomery.
October 4	Buena Vista	Michigan	1	3	4	A shooting during a gathering of approximately 30 to 50 people behind a Speedway store killed one person and injured three others when an altercation broke out.
October 4	Brazoria County	Texas	2	2	4	Two children were killed and two others were critically injured in a shooting at a truck stop located off of Highway 288 and FM 521 near Angleton. The mother of the children was taken into custody and charged with murder.
October 1	Atlanta (8)	Georgia	0	4	4	Three men were shot and a woman was grazed by a bullet at an apartment complex in the Lindridge/Martin Manor neighborhood.
September 28	Selma (2)	Alabama	1	3	4	A drive-by shooting outside an apartment complex killed one person and wounded three others.
September 28	Highland Park	Michigan	0	4	4	Four people, including two juveniles, were shot outside an apartment complex as they played a game of dice.
September 28	New Orleans (4)	Louisiana	1	4	5	An exchange of gunfire on Bourbon Street killed a female tourist and wounded three others. One of the shooters was also injured in the incident.
September 28	Grand Blanc Township	Michigan	3 (Note: Two other victims died from smoke inhalation from the suspect setting fire to the church)	5	8	2025 Grand Blanc Township church attack: A man rammed a vehicle through the front doors of a Mormon church south of the city of Grand Blanc. The man then exited the vehicle and opened fire, killing two people and injuring five others before setting the church on fire. Responding officers shot and killed the gunman. In addition to the gunshot casualties, two people died from the fire and a further three suffered from smoke inhalation.
September 27	Rosita	Texas	2	5	7	A person opened fire at the Kickapoo Lucky Eagle Casino in the Kickapoo Reservation during a raffle event late Saturday night, killing two people and injuring five others. The suspect fled and prompted a manhunt before being taken into custody in Wilson County.
September 27	Southport	North Carolina	3	6	9	2025 Southport shooting: A man on a boat coming up Cape Fear River opened fire on an outdoor bar on the shore of the Intracoastal Waterway, killing three people and wounding six others. A suspect was apprehended loading their boat at a public boat ramp in Oak Island to the west shortly afterwards.
September 27	Raleigh (2)	North Carolina	0	4	4	Four people were shot in a parking lot in Northeast Raleigh.
September 27	Rapides Parish	Louisiana	0	4	4	Four people were injured in a shooting south of Alexandria.
September 23	Hemet	California	1	3	4	A male juvenile was killed and three others were wounded in a shooting.
September 22	El Paso	Texas	0	5	5	Five teenagers were shot and injured after a group of people arrived to fight at an apartment complex. A 15-year-old boy was taken into custody.
September 21	Rocky Mount	North Carolina	1	4	5	A shooting at a home killed one man and wounded four others.
September 21	Indianapolis (4)	Indiana	2	5	7	An argument in a parking lot escalated into a shooting when a man took another man's gun and opened fire, causing that man to take out a second weapon and return fire. A third person may have shot the man who returned fire, and five bystanders were wounded while the two men who fired shots at each other were killed.
September 20	Green Level	North Carolina	0	5	5	A shooting during a large party wounded five people, including two juveniles.
September 20	Kalamazoo	Michigan	0	4	4	Four men were injured when a fight escalated into a shooting near Western Michigan University. None of the victims were associated with the school.
September 20	Shreveport (2)	Louisiana	2	6	8	Eight people were shot, two fatally, at a large gathering of over 150 people in the Allendale neighborhood. Authorities believe multiple shooters were involved.
September 19	Omaha (3)	Nebraska	0	4	4	Four people, including a teenage boy, were injured in a shooting at a grocery store in the Lincoln Heights neighborhood.
September 18	Jacksonville (2)	Florida	1	3	4	Five people, including a child, were fired upon by at least one occupant of another vehicle on Interstate 10 near the Interstate 95 split. A man was killed and three of them were wounded, but the child escaped uninjured.
September 18	Antioch	California	2	2	4	A late night shooting killed two people and injured two others, including a teenager.
September 18	Atlanta (7)	Georgia	0	4	4	Three teenagers and child were injured in a shooting at an apartment complex in the Peoplestown neighborhood.
September 17	North Codorus Township	Pennsylvania	4	2	6	A man ambushed police officers investigating the property of a woman south of Spring Grove who reported that an ex-boyfriend was stalking and harassing her. Upon opening the front door of a farmhouse, the man opened fire, killing three police officers and wounding two others. An injured officer managed to return fire and kill the shooter. Investigators also discovered that the ex-girlfriend's family dog had been fatally shot by the man before their arrival.
September 15	Minneapolis (7)	Minnesota	1	6	7	A woman was fatally wounded, and six others were injured in a shooting at a homeless encampment in the Longfellow neighborhood. The shooting happened on a property where the property owner had allowed homeless residents to camp on the property in protest of the perceived failure of city officials to address the homelessness crisis in the city.
September 15	Minneapolis (6)	Minnesota	1	4	5	Five men were injured in a shooting at a homeless encampment in the area of Lyndale and Whittier, including one critically. One man succumbed to his injuries five days later.
September 12	Chicago (19)	Illinois	0	4	4	Four men were injured in a shooting in the Englewood neighborhood.
September 11	Tampa (2)	Florida	1	5	6	A 17-year-old boy was killed and five men were wounded in an overnight shooting outside an apartment complex in the Northeast Tampa neighborhood.
September 9	San Francisco (3)	California	0	6	6	A shooting during a marijuana event in the India Basin neighborhood wounded six people.
September 8	Santa Ana	California	1	3	4	A gang-related shooting killed a 13-year-old boy and injured three other teenagers in the Santa Anita neighborhood.
September 7	Memphis (8)	Tennessee	0	4	4	Four juveniles were shot, aged 3 to 15, in the Hickory Hill neighborhood by suspects clad in ski masks and black clothing.
September 7	Cleveland (5)	Ohio	0	6	6	A fight at a bar escalated into a shooting that wounded six, including two teenagers and the suspect, in the Flats neighborhood.
September 7	Liberty County	Texas	2	4	6	A customer at a bar east of Plum Grove fetched a firearm from his vehicle and opened fire, killing a man and injuring five others before escaping. One man succumbed to his injuries a day later.
September 6	Portsmouth (3)	Virginia	1	3	4	An overnight shooting killed one person and wounded three others.
September 3	Kansas City (5)	Missouri	0	5	5	Five people were injured in a shooting at an apartment complex in the Hyde Park neighborhood.
September 1	New York City (7)	New York	1	4	5	A gunman in a vehicle opened fire on a group of men outside a deli in the Allerton section of the Bronx, killing one man and injuring four other men. After the shooting, the suspect sustained injuries after he collided with a stalled van a few blocks away from the scene.
September 1	Chicago (18)	Illinois	0	5	5	Five people, including a juvenile, were found injured by gunfire in Bronzeville.
August 31	Chicago (17)	Illinois	0	4	4	Four people were shot during a drive-by shooting in the West Town neighborhood.
August 30	Jackson (3)	Mississippi	2	2	4	Two men were killed and two others were injured in a shooting.
August 30	Chicago Heights	Illinois	1	4	5	A shooting killed a man and injured four others.
August 30	Chicago (16)	Illinois	0	7	7	Seven people were shot during a drive-by shooting when at least one gunman opened fire on a crowd in Bronzeville.
August 29	Lakeland	New York	0	4	4	Four people were shot at a fire department's recreation hall during a party being hosted there.
August 27	Minneapolis (5)	Minnesota	3	27	30	Annunciation Catholic Church shooting: A person opened fire in the Windom neighborhood through the windows of Church of the Annunciation at the beginning of morning Mass, killing two children sitting in the church pews and injuring 27 others, 24 of whom were children. Another person suffered a non-gunshot injury. The shooter then died by suicide.
August 26	Minneapolis (4)	Minnesota	1	6	7	A shooting in the Phillips West neighborhood behind Cristo Rey Jesuit High School killed a man and injured six others.
August 26	Los Angeles (6)	California	0	5	5	Five people were shot outside a market in the Vermont Knolls neighborhood.
August 24	Robinwood	Maryland	0	4	4	Four people were shot at a bar overnight.
August 24	Kansas City (4)	Missouri	2	3	5	An argument in a Downtown Kansas City parking lot escalated into a shooting that killed two men and injured three others, including a juvenile.
August 23	Juncos	Puerto Rico	2	2	4	Four men were shot and injured in the early morning, two of whom later died of their injuries. One of the survivors was killed in a separate shooting in October 2025.
August 23	New York City (6)	New York	2	3	5	A shooting during a basketball tournament being held in a park in the Baychester neighborhood of the Bronx killed a man and injured four others, including a teenage girl, who died six days later.
August 22	Perry	Florida	2	2	4	Two teenagers were killed while another teenager and a man were injured in a shooting at an apartment complex.
August 22	New York City (5)	New York	0	4	4	Four teenagers were shot in the Westchester Square neighborhood of the Bronx.
August 18	Mount Carbon	West Virginia	2	3	5	A man shot at four people in a carport, killing a man and injuring the other three, before entering his home next door and killing himself.
August 17	Jefferson Davis County	Mississippi	1	4	5	A teenager was killed and four others were injured in a shooting at a dragstrip southwest of Prentiss.
August 17	Saginaw	Michigan	0	5	5	Five people were shot after a street gathering descended into gunfire. One of the gunshot victims was also struck by a vehicle.
August 17	Richmond	Virginia	1	3	4	A man was killed and three others were injured in a shooting at an apartment complex in the Southwood neighborhood.
August 17	New York City (4)	New York	3	11	14	A dispute at a bar in the Crown Heights neighborhood of Brooklyn escalated into a gang-related shootout that killed three men and injured 11 others. Two of the dead, one of whom was affiliated with Folk Nation, were a part of the shootout while two other gunmen escaped.
August 16	Yakima County	Washington	0	5	5	Five people were injured in a shooting during a large party southeast of Grandview.
August 16	Chicago (15)	Illinois	0	4	4	Four people were shot in the Near West Side neighborhood.
August 16	Indianapolis (3)	Indiana	0	4	4	Four people were shot in the Martindale–Brightwood neighborhood.
August 11	Josephine County	Oregon	5	0	5	A man is suspected of shooting and killing his wife and their three children aged from 7 to 11 at their home west of Merlin before killing himself.
August 11	Chicago (14)	Illinois	0	5	5	Five people were wounded in a shooting in the Grand Boulevard area of the Bronzeville neighborhood.
August 10	Jackson (2)	Mississippi	0	8	8	Eight people were injured when a shooting near a nightclub broke out in the Fondren neighborhood.
August 10	Chicago (13)	Illinois	1	5	6	A woman was killed and five others, including three teens, were injured in a shooting in the South Austin neighborhood.
August 10	Chicago (12)	Illinois	0	4	4	Four people, including two teenage boys, were shot in the West Garfield Park neighborhood.
August 9	Baltimore (5)	Maryland	1	5	6	Six people, including a 5-year-old girl, were shot in the Park Heights neighborhood. A man who was critically injured later died.
August 9	Midland	Texas	0	4	4	A large street brawl escalated into a shooting that wounded four people.
August 7	East Cleveland	Ohio	2	2	4	An officer responding to a report of a domestic dispute was fired upon as he approached the home, wounding him, and the suspect escaped, sparking a manhunt. The suspect's grandfather and brother were found shot to death inside the home. Another officer was shot by the same suspect nearby overnight before the suspect was apprehended a few blocks away.
August 6	Fort Stewart	Georgia	0	5	5	A sergeant for the U.S. Army is accused of opening fire at Fort Stewart and wounding five service members.
August 4	San Juan (2)	Puerto Rico	3	3	6	Three people were killed and three others were injured in a shooting at a residence in the Hato Rey barrio.
August 4	Los Angeles (5)	California	2	6	8	Two people were killed and six others were injured when a shooting at an unauthorized after-party for a festival broke out in the Fashion District of Downtown Los Angeles.
August 3	Virginia Beach	Virginia	0	4	4	Four people were injured in an early morning shooting.
August 3	Augusta (2)	Georgia	1	3	4	A shooting at an Advance Auto Parts killed a 14-year-old boy and wounded another, and adjacent to the store at a Texaco gas station, two other people were shot.
August 3	Iowa City	Iowa	0	4	4	Four people were shot in a residential area.
August 2	Harvey	Illinois	1	6	7	Two people opened fire during a party, injuring five people, including a 4-year-old child, before another partygoer returned fire, killing one and injuring the other.
August 2	Omaha (2)	Nebraska	0	7	7	Seven people were injured when a shooting at a liquor store broke out near the Bedford Place neighborhood.
August 1	Memphis (7)	Tennessee	1	3	4	A drug deal gone wrong resulted in a shooting that killed a man and injured three others in the Westwood neighborhood.
August 1	Anaconda	Montana	4	0	4	2025 Anaconda shooting: A man is suspected of opening fire at a bar next door to where he lived, killing four people, before fleeing and sparking a manhunt. The suspect was captured seven days later.
August 1	Mayagüez	Puerto Rico	1	5	6	A teenager was killed and five others, including at least one other teenager, were injured in a shooting at a nightclub during informal "Prep Week" festivities ahead of the next semester of university. Several of the victims, not including the deceased teen, were students at various universities.
July 30	Atlanta (6)	Georgia	0	4	4	Four people were injured in a shooting at an apartment complex in the Scotts Crossing neighborhood.
July 30	Philadelphia (9)	Pennsylvania	0	5	5	At least one person opened fire at a recreation center in the Cobbs Creek neighborhood, injuring five people, among whom were two children and two teenagers.
July 29	Lake County	Tennessee	4	0	4	Four people were found shot to death northeast of Tiptonville. The suspect, who was dating a relative of the victims, allegedly abandoned a baby of two of the victims in a yard in Dyer County after the killings and was later arrested in Jackson after a seven-day manhunt after he was discovered hiding in a vacant pool house.
July 28	New York City (3)	New York	5	1	6	2025 Midtown Manhattan shooting: A man opened fire inside 345 Park Avenue in Midtown Manhattan, killing a New York City Police Department officer and a woman before spraying the lobby with gunfire. The man then shot a security officer and another man in the lobby before taking an elevator to the 33rd floor of the building where he killed another person before fatally shooting himself. Investigators believe the man was attempting to target the headquarters of the National Football League, but took the wrong elevator.
July 28	Detroit (3)	Michigan	2	2	4	A man and a woman were killed and two other women were injured in a shooting at a Marathon gas station in the Martin Park neighborhood.
July 28	Reno (2)	Nevada	4	3	7	A man opened fire in the valet area of Grand Sierra Resort, killing two men and injuring three other men, before fleeing through the parking lot where he encountered a security guard who he exchanged gunfire with. After this, the man shot and killed another man driving by in the parking lot before responding police officers shot and wounded him. The man died in the hospital three days after the shooting.
July 27	Flint	Michigan	1	4	5	An altercation that escalated into a shooting killed a man and injured four others.
July 27	Atlanta (5)	Georgia	1	10	11	A confrontation at a streetcar stop in the Sweet Auburn neighborhood escalated into a shooting that killed a man and injured ten others.
July 27	Chicago (11)	Illinois	0	4	4	Four teenagers were injured in a shooting in the West Garfield Park neighborhood.
July 27	Indianapolis (2)	Indiana	0	5	5	Five people were injured in a shooting in northeast Indianapolis, four of whom were in a vehicle at the time of the attack.
July 27	Mount Vernon	Illinois	2	5	7	A shooting during an unsanctioned event killed two people and injured five others less than an hour after midnight.
July 26	Denver (2)	Colorado	0	4	4	Four people were injured in a shooting in the LoDo neighborhood.
July 26	Yazoo City	Mississippi	0	4	4	Four juveniles were shot in a suspected gang-related attack.
July 26	Philadelphia (8)	Pennsylvania	2	2	4	Two men were killed and two others, a mother and her 7-year-old girl, were injured in a shooting in the Nicetown–Tioga neighborhood.
July 24	Philadelphia (7)	Pennsylvania	0	4	4	A shooting during a graduation party in the Stanton neighborhood wounded four people, including two children and their mother, and a man who happened to be passing by the party at the time of the incident.
July 24	Atlanta (4)	Georgia	1	5	6	A 17-year-old boy was killed and five others were injured in a shooting at Empire Park in the Glenrose Heights neighborhood.
July 23	Needles	California	1	3	4	A shooting at an apartment complex killed one man and injured three others.
July 20	Waynesboro	Mississippi	0	5	5	A drive-by shooting wounded five people.
July 20	Chicago (10)	Illinois	0	4	4	Four men were shot when they were reportedly attacked by three armed men in the Austin neighborhood.
July 19	Cleveland (4)	Ohio	1	3	4	Four teenagers were shot, one fatally, during an unauthorized block party in the Lee–Miles neighborhood.
July 19	Little Rock (2)	Arkansas	0	4	4	Four people were injured in a shooting at an apartment complex in Downtown Little Rock.
July 19	Shelby County	Tennessee	1	4	5	A shooting killed a football player for the Ole Miss Rebels and injured four others just east of Memphis in the Cordova area.
July 19	Chicago (9)	Illinois	1	3	4	A shooting in South Chicago killed a man and injured three others.
July 15	New York City (2)	New York	0	4	4	Four people, including a teenage boy, were struck by gunfire in the Belmont neighborhood in the Bronx.
July 13	Houston (6)	Texas	2	15	17	A drive-by shooting outside a nightclub in the Golfcrest / Bellfort / Reveille neighborhood of Southeast Houston killed two people and wounded fifteen others.
July 13	Lexington	Kentucky	3	3	6	2025 Lexington shootings: A man shot a state trooper near Blue Grass Airport during a traffic stop before hijacking a vehicle and driving to a church where he shot four people, killing two women and injuring two men. Responding officers shot and killed the man at the church.
July 13	Charlotte (2)	North Carolina	1	5	6	One person was killed and five others were injured in a shooting in Uptown Charlotte.
July 12	Easton	Pennsylvania	0	5	5	Five people were shot in the South Side of Easton.
July 12	Round Rock (1)	Texas	2	2	4	Two people were killed and two others were injured in a shooting at an apartment complex.
July 12	Milwaukee (5)	Wisconsin	2	3	5	Two people were killed and three others were injured when shots were fired outside a bar in Downtown Milwaukee.
July 12	Chattanooga	Tennessee	0	4	4	Four people were shot during a Tyner Academy class reunion being hosted at a convention center.
July 8	Rupert, Burley, & Heyburn	Idaho	4	0	4	A man is suspected to have shot and killed a woman in her home in Rupert before driving to Burley where he shot and killed two people inside another home. After the man was arrested, officers were asked to check behind a café in Heyburn where they found a man dead from a gunshot wound inside a vehicle. All four people are believed to have been shot by the same man.
July 7	Los Angeles (4)	California	0	4	4	Four people were shot in the Broadway-Manchester neighborhood.
July 7	Akron	Ohio	0	5	5	A group of more than 100 people partied in the parking lot of Mason Community Learning Center, an elementary school in the Middlebury neighborhood, after getting kicked out of a Waffle House in Springfield Township. During the party, a shooting began that wounded five people, including at least one teenager, and ten others were injured when they were struck by vehicles as people fled the attack.
July 7	Philadelphia (6)	Pennsylvania	0	4	4	Four young men were shot in the Haddington neighborhood of West Philadelphia.
July 7	Philadelphia (5)	Pennsylvania	3	9	12	A gunfight between multiple suspects in the Grays Ferry neighborhood killed three people and wounded nine others, including two juveniles. One person was injured when they were trampled by people fleeing the attack.
July 6	Natchitoches	Louisiana	1	5	6	A teenager was killed and five others were injured in a shooting.
July 6	Toledo	Ohio	2	2	4	A shooting outside a bar killed two people and wounded two others.
July 5	Dallas (5)	Texas	1	5	6	A fight in a parking lot under a bridge in the Deep Ellum neighborhood escalated into a shooting that killed a man and injured four others. An armed man, who has not yet been charged, was shot by police after police allege he ran towards responding police officers with his gun pointed towards them.
July 5	Sedro-Woolley	Washington	1	5	6	A shooting at a park killed one person and injured five others.
July 5	Talladega County	Alabama	4	0	4	Officers conducting a welfare check on a woman at the request of her grandmother found four people shot to death in an apartment leased by the woman's boyfriend. On July 22, a man was taken into custody and charged with four counts of capital murder for the shooting.
July 5	Honolulu	Hawaii	0	4	4	Four men were wounded in a drive-by shooting in the Kalihi neighborhood.
July 5	St. Louis (3)	Missouri	1	3	4	A man was killed and three others, including a teenager, was injured in a shooting in the Near North Riverfront neighborhood.
July 5	San Francisco (2)	California	1	4	5	One person was killed and four others were injured in a shooting in the Hunters Point neighborhood.
July 5	Lubbock	Texas	1	5	6	A fight at a gas station escalated when a man opened fire in a crowd, wounding five people, but a responding police officer allegedly shot the man when he aimed the gun at the crowd again while fleeing before fatally shooting him as he reached for the gun after he was initially shot.
July 5	Chicago (8)	Illinois	0	4	4	Four men were injured in a drive-by shooting as they sat in a vehicle together in the Little Village neighborhood.
July 5	Fort Wayne	Indiana	1	3	4	Four teenagers were shot, one killed, in the West Central area of Downtown Fort Wayne.
July 5	Brockton	Massachusetts	0	6	6	A fight during an Independence Day party escalated into a shooting that injured six people.
July 5	Cleveland (3)	Ohio	1	5	6	A man was killed and five others were wounded in a shooting at the Shoppes at Buckeye in Buckeye–Woodhill.
July 5	Albany (2)	New York	0	5	5	Four teens and a middle-aged adult were shot in the Arbor Hill neighborhood.
July 5	Indianapolis (1)	Indiana	2	5	7	Two people, including a juvenile, were killed and five others, including two other juveniles, were injured in a shooting in Downtown Indianapolis.
July 5	Philadelphia (4)	Pennsylvania	0	8	8	Eight people, two critically, were injured when a shooting broke out at a bar in the Passyunk Square neighborhood of South Philadelphia.
July 4	Dayton	Ohio	0	4	4	Four people were injured in a shooting during an Independence Day block party in the Southern Dayton View neighborhood.
July 4	Albany (1)	New York	0	4	4	At the end of Independence Day celebrations, an altercation in the Center Square/Hudson–Park Historic District area led to a person firing a handgun, striking four people, including a teenager, and another person firing a flaregun that started a structure fire. A responding officer was also injured when they were struck by a vehicle that was hit by an ambulance. The teenage victim died nearly two weeks later of his injuries.
July 4	Los Angeles (3)	California	0	4	4	A suspected gang-related shooting wounded four in the Vermont Vista neighborhood.
July 4	Charlottesville	Virginia	0	5	5	Five people, including two teenagers and two young children, were shot in the Fifeville neighborhood.
July 4	Chicago (7)	Illinois	0	7	7	Seven people were injured when at least two men approached them and opened fire in the Back of the Yards neighborhood.
July 4	Columbus (3)	Ohio	1	5	6	During an overnight house party in the Southern Orchards neighborhood, a shooting killed a teenager and wounded five others, including another teenager.
July 3	Atlanta (3)	Georgia	0	4	4	Four people were wounded when shots were fired into their apartment in the Summerhill neighborhood.
July 3	Chicago (6)	Illinois	0	4	4	Four men were injured when at least two people opened fire on them as they stood near a sidewalk in the West Englewood neighborhood.
July 3	Chicago (5)	Illinois	0	5	5	Five people were wounded in a shooting in the Riverdale neighborhood on the Far South Side.
July 2	Chicago (4)	Illinois	4	14	18	2025 Chicago shooting: A drive-by shooting occurred outside a restaurant holding a rapper's album release party in the River North neighborhood. Four people were killed and 14 were hospitalized.
July 1	Nicholasville	Kentucky	0	4	4	Four people were injured inside a vehicle, including two children, in a drive-by shooting.
June 29	Jersey City	New Jersey	0	5	5	Five people were wounded when shots were fired during a block party in the Greenville neighborhood.
June 29	Kingstree	South Carolina	2	2	4	Two boys were killed and another two were wounded in a shooting at an apartment complex.
June 29	Mobile (2)	Alabama	0	4	4	A drive-by shooting wounded the four occupants of another vehicle, causing them to crash, in the Lyons Park neighborhood.
June 28	Austin (2)	Texas	0	4	4	Four people were wounded in a shooting in the parking lot of a strip mall in the North Oaks neighborhood.
June 28	Springfield	Ohio	1	4	5	A shooting during a house party killed a person and wounded four others in the Roanoke neighborhood.
June 28	Kansas City (3)	Missouri	1	3	4	A shooting killed a man and wounded three others in the East Community neighborhood on the East Side.
June 28	New Orleans (3)	Louisiana	0	4	4	A shooting during a house party in the Little Woods neighborhood left four people wounded.
June 27	Portland	Oregon	0	4	4	A shooting outside an event center in the Centennial neighborhood left four injured, including a 15-year-old boy. A 16-year-old boy was arrested in connection for the shooting after he was identified by witnesses when he was located hiding inside a shed in the Glenfair neighborhood.
June 26	Trenton	New Jersey	1	3	4	A drive-by shooting killed a man and injured three others, including a teenage girl, in Central West Trenton.
June 23	Jonesboro	Georgia	0	4	4	A fight after a basketball game at a Baptist church led to a shooting in the parking lot, which injured four.
June 23	Newark (1)	New Jersey	1	4	5	A teenager was killed and four others were injured in a shooting in the Roseville neighborhood.
June 23	Baltimore (4)	Maryland	0	4	4	Four people were shot in the area of the Edmondson Avenue Historic District.
June 23	Baltimore (3)	Maryland	0	4	4	Four people were shot, including three teenagers, in a drive-by shooting in the Carrollton Ridge neighborhood.
June 22	Pittsburgh	Pennsylvania	0	5	5	At least five people were struck by gunfire and around ten other people were treated for graze wounds or injuries from falling in the East Liberty neighborhood.
June 22	Springfield	Missouri	0	4	4	Four people were shot at an apartment complex in Downtown Springfield.
June 22	Kansas City (2)	Missouri	1	5	6	A man was killed and four others were wounded in a shooting in the Wendell Phillips neighborhood.
June 22	Oakland County	Michigan	1	3	4	A man was killed and three others, including two teenagers, were wounded in a shooting at a park just north of Detroit.
June 22	Baton Rouge	Louisiana	1	5	6	A fight among of group of women at a nightclub escalated when a group of men intervened and began exchanging gunfire with each other in the parking lot. A police officer exchanged gunfire with a gunman, but neither was injured. A woman was killed and five others were injured during the shootout.
June 21	Moreno Valley	California	0	6	6	Six teenagers were shot in a parking lot during a social gathering.
June 21	Tulsa (5)	Oklahoma	0	5	5	Five people were injured, including four teenagers, when shots were fired at an abandoned warehouse being used for a party. Two others suffered non-gunshot injuries while fleeing the gunfire.
June 21	Tulsa (4)	Oklahoma	1	7	8	A man was killed under an overpass and seven others were injured in a shooting during Juneteenth celebrations in the area of the Greenwood District and Oklahoma State University–Tulsa.
June 21	Compton	California	0	4	4	Four people were shot at Sibrie Park just east of Dr. Ronald E. McNair Elementary.
June 21	Anderson County	South Carolina	1	9	10	A woman was killed and nine others were injured in a shooting when a fight at a Juneteenth celebration escalated west of Anderson.
June 20	Milwaukee (4)	Wisconsin	1	4	5	A 19-year-old woman was killed and four other teenagers were wounded in a shooting in the Northridge neighborhood.
June 19	Tulsa (3)	Oklahoma	0	4	4	After a party was broken up by police officers, the partygoers moved to a parking lot in the Riverview neighborhood where multiple shooters opened fire, wounding at least four.
June 17	Winston County	Mississippi	1	3	4	A man was killed and three others were injured in a drive-by shooting south of Louisville.
June 17	Milwaukee (3)	Wisconsin	0	4	4	Four adults were shot in the Walker's Point neighborhood.
June 16	Middletown	Ohio	1	3	4	A man was killed and three others were injured when shots were fired at patrons as they left a bar as it closed.
June 16	Cleveland (2)	Ohio	1	5	6	A fight during a block party in the St. Clair–Superior neighborhood escalated into a shooting that killed a man and injured five others.
June 16	Miami	Florida	2	2	4	Two men were killed inside vehicles and two others were injured in a shooting in the Little Haiti neighborhood.
June 15	Hartford (2)	Connecticut	0	5	5	An argument inside a Caribbean American Society building in the Upper Albany neighborhood escalated when two groups opened fire on each other, wounding five.
June 15	West Valley City	Utah	3	2	5	Three people were killed, including an infant, and two others were injured when a 16-year-old pulled out a gun after an argument and opened fire on a group of people at WestFest. The suspect was shot at by police but was not struck and was taken into custody.
June 15	Stark County	Ohio	0	4	4	Four people were wounded at a bar in an unincorporated enclave inside of Canton.
June 15	Elkhart (2)	Indiana	1	11	12	A person was killed and eleven others were injured when multiple people opened fire.
June 14	Greenville	Mississippi	0	4	4	Four people were wounded in a shooting shortly before midnight.
June 14	Kansas City (1)	Missouri	2	2	4	A woman was killed and three others were injured in a shooting in the parking lot of a BP gas station on the East Side. One of the injured died weeks later.
June 14	Nashville (1)	Tennessee	1	4	5	An argument between a woman and her boyfriend as they drove to visit family in Nashville escalated when the boyfriend allegedly attempted to crash the vehicle before opening fire on her and her five children, striking her and four of her children. The man then allegedly chased her as she ran for help, but was taken into custody. The woman's 4-year-old child was killed.
June 14	Columbus (2)	Ohio	1	6	7	Seven people were shot when a suspect opened fire from a vehicle in Downtown Columbus on a gathering of people. A man died of his injuries the following day.
June 14	Reno (1)	Nevada	1	4	5	An 18-year-old was killed and four others, including two juveniles, were injured in a shooting on a road south of Truckee Meadows Community College.
June 14	Dover (1)	Delaware	1	4	5	A man was killed and four others were injured when multiple people opened fire on them as they stood outside a house.
June 14	Champlin & Brooklyn Park	Minnesota	2	2	4	2025 shootings of Minnesota legislators: A suspect believed to be posing as a police officer shot state senator John Hoffman and his wife at their home in Champlin during the early morning hours. Officers then conducted a welfare check on state senator Melissa Hortman at her home in Brooklyn Park because she lived nearby. They found the suspect at Hortman's home; he exchanged gunfire with them before fleeing. Hortman and her husband were both found shot and died from their injuries. The Hortman's dog was also shot and was later euthanized.
June 11	Jacksonville (1)	Florida	1	3	4	A shooting at an apartment complex in the Magnolia Gardens neighborhood killed an 18-year-old and wounded three others, including at least one juvenile.
June 11	Detroit (2)	Michigan	0	4	4	Four people were shot during a cookout in the Greenfield-Grand River neighborhood.
June 9	Augusta (1)	Georgia	0	4	4	Four people were found shot in the lobby of an apartment building in the Summerville neighborhood.
June 9	Washington (2)	District of Columbia	1	3	4	A man was killed and three others were injured in a shooting in the Trinidad neighborhood of Northeast DC.
June 8	Milwaukee (2)	Wisconsin	0	4	4	Four people were wounded in a shooting near the Deer District in Downtown Milwaukee.
June 8	LaGrange	Georgia	1	6	7	A 19-year-old man was killed and six others were wounded in a shooting.
June 8	Cleveland (1)	Ohio	0	7	7	Seven teens were injured when gunshots erupted during drag racing in the Lee-Miles neighborhood.
June 7	Benton Harbor	Michigan	0	6	6	Six people were injured in a shooting during a house party.
June 7	Portsmouth (2)	Virginia	0	4	4	A shooting during a graduation party at a home wounded four, including two minors.
June 7	Sanford	North Carolina	0	6	6	An altercation that escalated into a gunfight at a bar left six injured, including two suspects.
June 6	Cheneyville	Louisiana	0	5	5	Five people were wounded in a shooting near the town hall.
June 6	Milwaukee (1)	Wisconsin	1	3	4	Four people were shot, one fatally, outside a food store in the Hampton Heights neighborhood. Minutes later, another shooting on the same street killed one and wounded another, but it is unclear if the attacks were connected.
June 6	Columbia	South Carolina	1	3	4	A man was killed and three others were injured in a shooting inside a home hosting a house party in the Elmwood Park neighborhood.
June 5	Dallas (4)	Texas	0	7	7	Seven people were shot in the Wheatley Place neighborhood.
June 1	Minneapolis (3)	Minnesota	1	5	6	A woman was killed in a vehicle and five others were injured in a shooting at Boom Island Park in the St. Anthony West neighborhood. Another woman suffered a non-gunshot injury.
June 1	Asheville	North Carolina	1	4	5	After a man was denied entry to a bar in Downtown Asheville for harassing a group of women, he retrieved a firearm from his vehicle and engaged in a scuffle with a bouncer and a patron who attempted to aid the bouncer. The man then opened fire, and the patron returned fire, killing the man. Four people were struck by gunfire in the exchange.
June 1	Danville	Virginia	1	4	5	A suspected exchange of gunfire between the occupants of a car and a gathering killed a man inside the vehicle and wounded four.
June 1	Catawba County	North Carolina	1	11	12	One person was killed and eleven others were injured, one critically and ten seriously, in a shooting at a house party in the early morning south of Mountain View.
May 31	Snellville	Georgia	0	4	4	Four teenagers were shot at Briscoe Park.
May 31	Fayette	Mississippi	1	5	6	Six people were shot, one fatally, during the Fayette Festival.
May 31	Chicago (3)	Illinois	0	7	7	Seven teenagers were shot in a drive-by shooting on a crowd at an after-prom party at a house on the South Side near Saint Sabina Church.
May 30	Clarksville	Indiana	0	4	4	Four people were injured in a shootout during a party at an apartment complex. It was initially reported there were five injuries, but a victim was counted at a hospital twice. Two suspects who are not adults were arrested.
May 29	Marion County	South Carolina	2	2	4	Two people were killed and two others were injured in a shooting south of Marion.
May 29	Gibson County	Indiana	3	1	4	Officers responded to a shooting at a home southwest of Haubstadt where they encountered a male suspect, who surrendered to them. Three people were killed and another person was critically injured in the home.
May 28	Lakewood	Washington	0	7	7	Seven people were wounded in a shooting at Harry Todd Park while hundreds of people were in attendance.
May 28	Atlanta (2)	Georgia	0	4	4	Four men were shot at a gas station in southwest Atlanta.
May 28	Mākaha	Hawaii	1	3	4	A shooting killed a 19-year-old man and wounded three others.
May 27	Waterbury	Connecticut	0	5	5	Five people were wounded in a suspected targeted attack at Brass Mill Center.
May 26	Philadelphia (3)	Pennsylvania	2	9	11	Two people were killed and nine others, including three juveniles, were injured in a shooting at Fairmount Park.
May 26	Alexandria	Virginia	0	4	4	Four people were shot in the Arlandria neighborhood over a dispute.
May 25	Little River	South Carolina	0	10	10	Ten people were shot due to an altercation on a docked charter boat in the Intracoastal Waterway and in a marina. One other person suffered a non-gunshot injury as a result of the incident. Additionally, a North Myrtle Beach police officer accidentally shot himself while responding to the scene.
May 24	Jackson (2)	Tennessee	0	7	7	Seven people were shot, including juveniles, at Kate Campbell Robertson Memorial Park.
May 24	Colorado Springs	Colorado	0	6	6	Six people were injured, including one critically, after an argument with multiple people escalated near Mitchell High School.
May 24	Savannah	Georgia	0	4	4	A physical altercation between two groups escalated into a shooting that left four injured near Ellis Square.
May 23	Chester	Pennsylvania	1	5	6	A 16-year-old boy was killed and five others were injured in a shooting at a house party.
May 22	McKinney	Texas	1	3	4	A man shot four people outside a sports bar following a dispute.
May 20	Rayville	Louisiana	0	4	4	Four people were found injured at an apartment building.
May 18	St. Louis (2)	Missouri	4	0	4	Four people were found fatally shot inside an apartment building in Carondelet.
May 18	Macon	Georgia	3	6	9	Three people were killed and six others were injured in a shooting at a bar. Three suspects, including a teenager, were arrested, while another suspect killed himself.
May 17	Summit Township	Michigan	1	3	4	A group of men opened fire during a small party at a house, killing a 44-year-old man and critically injuring three other men.
May 17	Seattle	Washington	3	1	4	Three people were killed and one man was critically injured in a shooting at a nightclub in Downtown Seattle.
May 16	Chicago (2)	Illinois	0	4	4	Four people, including a teenager, were injured in a drive-by shooting in the Homan Square neighborhood.
May 16	Las Vegas	Nevada	2	3	5	A gunman opened fire at a gym, killing one man and injuring three others, before being shot and killed by responding police officers.
May 11	Valdosta	Georgia	0	4	4	Four people, including two teens, were shot following an argument over a charging cable.
May 11	Florence County	South Carolina	1	6	7	One person was killed and six others were injured in a shooting during a fight in the parking lot of a nightclub.
May 10	Paramount	California	0	4	4	Two women and two children were shot.
May 10	Arvin	California	2	2	4	Two men were killed and two others, including a juvenile, were injured when a gun battle erupted at a neighborhood intersection.
May 10	Philadelphia (2)	Pennsylvania	0	4	4	Four children were injured in a shooting on a SEPTA bus in Fairmount Park.
May 9	Detroit (1)	Michigan	2	3	5	Two people were killed and three others, including an 11-year-old girl who was grazed by a bullet, were injured in a shooting in the Brightmoor neighborhood.
May 7	Hartford (1)	Connecticut	0	4	4	Multiple shooters opened fire in an "ambush style" at an outdoor dice game, injuring four people.
May 6	Memphis (6)	Tennessee	2	3	5	Two men were killed and three others were injured after a fight that escalated broke out in a sports bar in the Frayser neighborhood.
May 5	North Charleston	South Carolina	2	3	5	A man killed a woman and injured three others, including his girlfriend, after a domestic dispute escalated at an apartment complex. He was later found dead in the trailer park.
May 5	Sharon	Pennsylvania	0	4	4	Four teens were shot at a house party.
May 5	Oklahoma City (1)	Oklahoma	0	7	7	A fight broke out inside a bar in the Midtown neighborhood. At some point, an individual pulled out a gun and opened fire, injuring seven people.
May 5	Charlotte (1)	North Carolina	1	3	4	One person was killed and three others, two critically, were injured in an afternoon shooting in the Montclaire South neighborhood.
May 4	Corozal	Puerto Rico	2	2	4	Four people were shot in a bar.
May 4	Denver (1)	Colorado	0	4	4	Four people were shot in the Union Station neighborhood of Downtown Denver.
May 4	Glendale	Arizona	3	5	8	Multiple shooters opened fire at a steakhouse next door to the police headquarters, killing three people and injuring five others.
May 4	Tulsa (2)	Oklahoma	1	6	7	Multiple people began shooting into a large crowd during a fight with semi-automatic pistols in Downtown Tulsa. A shooter was killed while at least six others, including another shooter, suffered injuries.
May 4	Houston (5)	Texas	1	15	16	During a family party in southeast Houston, an uninvited guest who was asked to leave opened fire, killing an 18-year-old and injuring fifteen others. Others at the party returned fire.
May 3	Little Rock (1)	Arkansas	1	3	4	A man was killed and three others were wounded in a shooting in the South End of Little Rock.
May 3	Eastpointe	Michigan	2	2	4	A person opened fire during an argument with two groups outside of a Foot Locker store, killing two and wounding two others.
May 2	Woodlawn	Maryland	1	3	4	A shooting inside a nightclub wounded four. One victim died the following day.
April 29	Minneapolis (2)	Minnesota	4	1	5	Five people were shot in the head in the Midtown Phillips neighborhood, four of whom who died. A member of the Native Mob was charged with shooting the victims.
April 28	Gulfport	Mississippi	1	3	4	Two armed men are suspected of traveling to confront a group of people and then opening fire, killing a teenage boy and injuring three others.
April 27	Memphis (5)	Tennessee	1	4	5	Five people were shot, one fatally, at a Mexican restaurant in the Parkway Village neighborhood.
April 27	Elizabeth City	North Carolina	1	4	5	A shooting after the conclusion of a day of a week-long celebration left a man dead and four others injured at Elizabeth City State University. The deceased man was not a student of the school, and three of the wounded victims were students, while two others were injured in the subsequent commotion.
April 26	Myrtle Beach	South Carolina	1	11	12	A man opened fire during an altercation with multiple people before being fatally shot by a responding officer. Eleven people were injured, including one who was injured by police gunfire.
April 20	Ruston	Louisiana	1	5	6	A dispute between family members led to a shooting in the parking lot of a barber shop which killed a man and injured five others.
April 20	Houston (4)	Texas	0	4	4	Four people were injured, two critically, in a drive-by shooting outside of a bar in southeast Houston.
April 19	Memphis (4)	Tennessee	1	4	5	Five people were shot and injured, including two critically, in a drive-by shooting in the Medical District. One of the victims later succumbed to their injuries.
April 18	Garland	Texas	1	3	4	Three children and an adult were shot at an apartment complex. A 15-year-old died at the hospital from their injuries. No arrests have been made.
April 17	Tallahassee	Florida	2	6	8	2025 Florida State University shooting: Two food service employees were killed, and at least six others, including the shooter, were injured in a shooting in the area of the student union building at Florida State University.
April 15	Dallas (3)	Texas	0	4	4	A student let an armed student into Wilmer-Hutchins High School through a locked side door. Moments later, the 17-year-old male suspect opened fire, striking four male students in a hallway before fleeing, but later that same day, the suspect turned himself in. One other student suffered a non-gunshot injury when he fell, and investigators believe the suspect was targeting a specific student over a dispute.
April 13	St. Louis (1)	Missouri	1	4	5	A man was killed and four others were injured in a shooting at Fairground Park in the Fairground neighborhood.
April 13	Conway	Arkansas	2	9	11	Two people were killed and nine others were injured in a shooting at Fifth Avenue Park.
April 13	New Orleans (2)	Louisiana	0	5	5	As officers directed a large crowd in the Central Business District leaving French Quarter Festival, a person opened fire and wounded five before fleeing. The suspect was arrested by officers a block away from the attack.
April 13	Daytona Beach	Florida	1	3	4	A shooting during an overnight party in a parking lot killed one and injured three others.
April 12	Harris County	Texas	1	6	7	A shooting during a gathering to raise money at a Shell gas station north of Barrett killed one and injured six others, including at least one teenager.
April 11	Stockton	California	0	6	6	Six men were shot outside a barber shop just west of Edison High School.
April 9	Memphis (3)	Tennessee	1	5	6	A shooting during a meeting for a community violence intervention program in a business park left one man dead and five others injured.
April 8	Spotsylvania County	Virginia	3	3	6	During an illegal gun sale in a neighborhood south of Fredericksburg, four teen suspects opened fire, killing three and injuring two others. A witness to the robbery opened fire on one of the suspects, wounding a 16-year-old suspect.
April 5	Westmont	California	1	4	5	A shooting killed a man and injured four others.
April 5	Kansas City	Kansas	2	2	4	A shooting killed two men and injured two others.
April 4	Knoxville	Tennessee	0	4	4	Four people were shot in the parking lot of a pub after midnight.
April 3	Sabattus	Maine	3	2	5	A 29-year-old man fatally shot his mother in her car before exiting and opening fire on passing cars, killing one person and injuring two others, before killing himself.
March 31	San Antonio (2)	Texas	1	4	5	A fight on the patio of a bar in the Vance neighborhood escalated when a person in the parking lot opened fire, striking four people. One of the victims returned fire and killed the shooter.
March 30	Salinas	Puerto Rico	3	4	7	Seven people were shot in a drive-by shooting. One of the injured died of her injuries a month later.
March 30	San Francisco (1)	California	0	4	4	Four people were shot in the Bayview neighborhood.
March 30	Hammond	Indiana	2	3	5	In the parking lot of a pub, a domestic situation escalated into a shooting that killed two and injured three. Four of the victims were shot when they attempted to intervene in the incident.
March 30	Austin (1)	Texas	0	4	4	Four people were shot shortly after midnight in Downtown Austin.
March 29	Orangeburg County	South Carolina	0	7	7	At an event venue southeast of Orangeburg, a man who was out on bond for an armed robbery and had disabled his ankle monitor was suspected of firing into a crowd, wounding seven. In the subsequent chaos, three other people were injured.
March 29	Baltimore (2)	Maryland	0	4	4	Four people, including a teenager, were shot in the Oakenshawe neighborhood.
March 29	Frederickson	Washington	2	4	6	A street fight outside of a house party escalated into a shooting that left two juveniles dead and four others injured.
March 26	Pembroke Park	Florida	5	1	6	A man opened fire at an apartment complex, killing a woman, an infant, two toddlers, and injuring a 10-year-old girl before mortally wounding himself.
March 23	Houston (3)	Texas	0	6	6	An argument at an after-hours nightclub in the Gulfton neighborhood escalated into a shooting when a man fired shots into the entrance of the club, wounding six men.
March 22	Jackson (1)	Mississippi	1	7	8	A man was killed and seven others were injured in a shooting at the site of a Saint Patrick's Day parade after the conclusion of festivities. Three people were arrested, including an off-duty police officer and his brother.
March 22	Clarence	Louisiana	0	4	4	Four people, including two teenage boys, were wounded when shots were fired at a trail ride event.
March 21	Phoenix (1)	Arizona	1	3	4	A man was killed and three others were wounded in a shooting at a Red Roof Inn.
March 21	Moses Lake	Washington	1	4	5	A drive-by shooting killed a teenage boy and injured four others, including at least one other teenager.
March 21	Country Club Estates	Georgia	1	3	4	Four men were shot, one fatally, inside an apartment.
March 21	Las Cruces (1)	New Mexico	3	15	18	A confrontation between two groups at a car meetup escalated into a shooting during a large gathering at Young Park, killing three men and injuring fifteen others. Four suspects, a 20-year-old man and three teens, ages 17 and 15, were taken into custody.
March 19	Selma (1) & Dallas County (2)	Alabama	1 (Note: Victim injured by gunshot, killed by non-gunshot injury)	3	4	A man shot his ex-wife and his teenage son at his home in Selma before driving into the surrounding county, allegedly to attack other people at random. The man shot and grazed a man in the head before running the victim over with his vehicle, then pistol-whipped a woman after his gun jammed when he attempted to shoot her, before shooting an elderly woman in her yard who was on her phone before bludgeoning her to death with the engine block of his vehicle because he believed she was calling the police. After killing his last victim, the man tried to force his way into her home, where other people were present, before he was arrested.
March 18	Chatham County	Georgia	0	5	5	A man out on bond opened fire at an apartment complex near Savannah, striking multiple buildings and vehicles and wounding five people. Later that day, the suspect crashed a car and ran from Savannah police before being arrested.
March 15	Verona	New Jersey	0	4	4	A fight in the parking lot of a venue hosting a party escalated into a shooting, which wounded four.
March 15	Shreveport (1)	Louisiana	2	2	4	Two people were killed and two people were injured in a shooting in Downtown Shreveport.
March 14	Chicago (1)	Illinois	0	5	5	An argument at a liquor store in the Back of the Yards neighborhood escalated when a man and a woman opened fire on another group, injuring four. A person in the other group returned fire and wounded the man.
March 12	Seaford	Delaware	1	3	4	A man was killed and three other men were injured when a fight at a park escalated.
March 10	Huntsville	Alabama	0	4	4	Four people were shot outside a bar in North Huntsville.
March 4	Mamou	Louisiana	2	12	14	During Mardi Gras festivities and while Chris Ardoin performed on stage, at least one person opened fire, killing two and injuring twelve others.
March 4	Severn	Maryland	2	2	4	An argument during a pickup basketball game escalated into a shooting that killed two men and injured two others.
March 2	Biloxi	Mississippi	0	4	4	A shooting that broke out at a nightclub injured four.
March 2	Portsmouth (1)	Virginia	1	3	4	A shooting killed a man and injured three others.
March 2	Houston (2)	Texas	0	5	5	A shooting at a bar in the MacGregor neighborhood, in which the suspect appeared to fire at random on patrons as the bar closed, left five people injured.
March 1	La Parguera	Puerto Rico	0	5	5	A licensed gun owner accidentally fired a shot from his pistol as he sat down, injuring him in the legs and four other people with bullet fragments.
March 1	Hayward	California	0	4	4	Four people were shot outside a restaurant in North Hayward.
March 1	Dallas County (1)	Alabama	0	6	6	An argument during a party after a trail ride escalated when a suspect opened fire, wounding six females, some of whom were teenagers in the Sardis area south of Selma.
February 27	Columbus (1)	Ohio	1	3	4	A shooting outside a home that stemmed from a dispute left a man dead and three others injured in the South of Main neighborhood of east Columbus.
February 24	Dallas (2)	Texas	3	2	5	A fight between two groups of people in the La Bajada neighborhood of West Dallas killed three and injured two others when it escalated into a shooting. Shortly afterwards, another shooting happened near the Children's Medical Center Dallas in the Southwestern Medical District and was reportedly connected to the first incident.
February 22	Shiloh	Pennsylvania	2	5	7	UPMC Memorial Hospital shooting: A man armed with a pistol and carrying zip ties entered UPMC Memorial Hospital's intensive care unit and took staff members hostage. Responding police officers opened fire as the man held a female staff member at gunpoint, beginning a shoot-out in which the man and a police officer were killed and three staff members and two other police officers were wounded. A fourth staff member was injured while fleeing.
February 21	Lake Station	Indiana	5	0	5	Police officers responding to a home for a welfare check found five people, two adults and three children, shot to death inside. It was later determined that one of the adults had shot the other four before killing himself.
February 20	Gary	Indiana	0	4	4	A dispute between three men in the Black Oak neighborhood escalated into a shooting, leaving the three men injured. A 10-year-old boy was struck by a stray bullet inside his home.
February 18	Tampa (1)	Florida	1	3	4	Four people were shot, one fatally, in the College Hills neighborhood.
February 16	Stonecrest	Georgia	1	4	5	During a car meet-up, unidentified suspects attempted to rob a 16-year-old boy, which then escalated into a shooting that wounded him and three other teenagers and killed a 20-year-old man.
February 15	Rock Hill	South Carolina	0	4	4	A shooting during a gathering at an apartment wounded four people.
February 15	Roanoke	Virginia	0	5	5	Five people were wounded in a shooting in northwest Roanoke.
February 12	Río Grande	Puerto Rico	2	4	6	Two children were killed in a shooting that injured a third child and three adults.
February 12	Ferguson	Missouri	1	3	4	A drive-by shooting killed a person and left three others wounded.
February 10	Byron	Wyoming	5	0	5	A mother shot and killed her three daughters and mortally wounded her other daughter inside a home. She called the police before shooting herself, and she later died at a hospital.
February 9	Los Angeles (2)	California	1	6	7	A teenager was killed and six men were wounded when a suspect opened fire at a house party while being escorted out in the Woodland Hills neighborhood.
February 8	Raleigh (1)	North Carolina	0	4	4	Four men were shot at an apartment in east Raleigh.
February 8	Casa Grande	Arizona	1	5	6	One man was killed and five others, including two teens, were wounded in a shooting.
February 8	Tulsa (1)	Oklahoma	2	2	4	Two teenagers were killed and two others were injured in an ambush attack at an apartment complex near the Columbus neighborhood of east Tulsa.
February 7	Atlanta (1)	Georgia	0	4	4	Four men showed up to Grady Memorial Hospital with gunshot wounds. Police later determined that they had been shot in the Lakewood Heights neighborhood of south Atlanta.
February 6	Gadsden County	Florida	3	3	6	During an armed robbery at a gas station south of Quincy, a man shot and killed two people and injured two others before fleeing and setting off a manhunt. The man was spotted by officers in Columbia County the following day, and they began a pursuit which ended in a crash just northwest of Live Oak in Suwannee County, where the robber shot and wounded a Suwannee County deputy before he was shot and killed by police.
February 4	New Albany	Ohio	2	4	6	An employee of a warehouse opened fire on coworkers, killing one and injuring five others. One of the injured died two days later. The suspect was later arrested at a home in Columbus.
February 2	Allentown	Pennsylvania	1	3	4	One person was killed and three others were injured when a fight between two people inside the club escalated into a shooting near the Rittersville neighborhood.
February 1	Columbia County	Oregon	2	3	5	A man opened fire when a domestic dispute escalated north of Clatskanie, killing one person and wounding three others. One of the wounded fired back and killed the shooter.
January 31	West Rancho Dominguez	California	2	5	7	Two men were killed and five others, including a juvenile, were wounded in a shooting at Athens Park.
January 29	Memphis (2)	Tennessee	2	3	5	A shooting at a home in the College Park neighborhood just north of LeMoyne-Owen College killed two and injured three others.
January 27	San Juan (1)	Puerto Rico	5	0	5	An employee at a plumbing business in the Puerto Nuevo neighborhood shot and killed four co-workers before killing himself.
January 27	Philadelphia (1)	Pennsylvania	1	3	4	A shooting at a ballroom in the Frankford neighborhood of Northeast Philadelphia killed a man and injured three others.
January 27	Elkhart (1)	Indiana	3	2	5	A man walked into a Martin's Super Market and attempted to kidnap a 19-year-old employee. As a manager attempted to calm the suspect, he shot and killed the employee and fired at random people nearby, killing a customer. The shooter ran to a nearby apartment complex, where he shot at and wounded two police officers before the officers killed him.
January 26	Bon Air	Virginia	0	5	5	Five people, including one targeted person, were injured when a shooting between two groups broke out at a pub.
January 26	Amarillo	Texas	1	8	9	An altercation that later escalated into a drive-by shooting outside a nightclub injured nine, one fatally. The suspected shooter, a driver, and a passenger were arrested, the latter just for public intoxication.
January 25	Memphis (1)	Tennessee	0	4	4	Four people were wounded in a targeted shooting in the Orange Mound neighborhood, in which three suspects got out of a vehicle and opened fire on the occupants of another vehicle near a community center.
January 24	Mobile (1)	Alabama	1	3	4	A shooting in the Maysville neighborhood left four people wounded. After the suspect turned himself in at the jail, a wounded teenager later died.
January 22	Baltimore (1)	Maryland	1	3	4	A fight at a basketball game that soon escalated into a targeted shooting outside of school killed a woman and injured three others, including two children who were grazed by bullets, in the Mid-Govans neighborhood of North Baltimore.
January 22	San Antonio (1)	Texas	1	7	8	Officers responding to a suicide-in-progress call from a man's family member at an apartment in the Far North Central area were fired upon by the man, leaving seven officers injured, most with shrapnel wounds. After several hours of the man being barricaded inside the apartment, officers found him dead inside after midnight.
January 22	Los Angeles (1)	California	0	6	6	Five people were injured in a suspected drive-by shooting outside a Yoshinoya restaurant in the Westlake neighborhood. One of the suspects was also wounded.
January 21	Minneapolis (1)	Minnesota	0	4	4	Four people, including a juvenile, were wounded when someone opened fire on them as they sat in a car together in the Whittier neighborhood.
January 21	Jackson (1)	Tennessee	1	3	4	A man was killed and three others were injured in a targeted shooting inside a Slim Chickens restaurant just northeast of Union University.
January 19	Boynton Beach	Florida	1	5	6	One person was killed and five others were injured when an altercation between two people at a gathering escalated into a shooting.
January 18	River Ridge	Louisiana	3	2	5	A man fatally shot his wife and 2-year-old daughter and injured his 9-year-old and 13-year-old daughters at their home before he was shot and killed by police.
January 14	Houston (1)	Texas	2	2	4	An apparent argument over drugs led to a shooting that left two men dead and two other men wounded in the North Shore neighborhood.
January 12	Omaha (1)	Nebraska	1	4	5	Five people were shot, one fatally, when a shooting broke out at an after-hours club in the Kountze Place neighborhood of the north side.
January 11	Webster Parish	Louisiana	0	6	6	A shooting at a large party south of Dubberly wounded six. The party was being hosted on private property without a permit and was charging entrance fees, and featured a DJ and performers.
January 5	Tucson (1)	Arizona	0	4	4	An argument that escalated into a shooting injured four.
January 3	Washington (1)	District of Columbia	0	5	5	A dispute that escalated into a shooting wounded five, including the shooter, in the Eckington neighborhood of Northeast DC.
January 1	Dallas (1)	Texas	1	3	4	An argument in the Wolf Creek neighborhood escalated when a suspect opened fire, killing a man and injuring three others.
January 1	New Orleans (1)	Louisiana	1	5	6	2025 New Orleans truck attack: A man who was inspired by the Islamic State and is also believed to have planted bombs around the area, drove a rented truck through Bourbon Street in the French Quarter, attempting to strike revelers during New Year's celebrations. The man killed fourteen people and injured several dozen others with the truck before he crashed into a crane, after which he exited the vehicle and opened fire, striking five people, including two officers, before he was fatally shot by police.
January 1	New York City (1)	New York	0	10	10	Four men opened fire on a queue of people outside a music venue in the Jamaica neighborhood of Queens, wounding ten.
January 1	Kankakee	Illinois	2	5	7	Two people were killed and five others were injured when a shooting broke out at a New Year's Eve party.

== Monthly statistics ==
Statistics are only updated at the end of each month.

2025 US mass shooting statistics by month
Month	Mass shootings	Total number dead (including the shooter/s)	Total number wounded (including the shooter/s)	Occurred at a school or university	Occurred at a place of worship	Total days without mass shootings
January	25	27	102	0	0	15
February	21	33	71	0	0	10
March	31	29	144	0	0	15
April	23	28	102	3	0	14
May	45	43	199	0	0	8
June	59	36	262	0	1	11
July	63	64	280	1	1	10
August	41	41	200	1	1 (Note: August's school and church shooting were the same incident, the Annunciation Catholic Church shooting)	10 (Note: One incident spanned two days, bringing the total down to 10)
September	33	31	140	0	1	12
October	34	37	165	2	0	14
November	23	21	109	0	0	19
December	27	30	126	1	0	12
Total	425	420	1,900	8	4	150
