= 2025 Stockton birthday party shooting =

Mass shooting in California, US

- Location of the shooting in California
- Location: 38.0335°N 121.3378°W; Monkey Space; 1955 Lucile Avenue; San Joaquin County, California, U.S.
- Date: November 29, 2025 c. 6:00 p.m. (PST; UTC−08:00)
- Attack type: Mass shooting; pedicide
- Deaths: 4
- Injuries: 13
- Perpetrator: Unknown
- Motive: Under investigation

On November 29, 2025, a mass shooting during a child's birthday party at the Monkey Space event hall killed four people, three of whom were children, and injured thirteen others in unincorporated San Joaquin County near Stockton, California, United States. The attack, which possibly involved multiple shooters, may have been a targeted gang-related attack. No arrests of suspects have been made.

== Background ==
The city of Stockton endured 3,680 violent crimes in 2024, which is almost double the statewide violent crime rate. The area of San Joaquin Valley, where the city is located and the location of the shooting, also had the highest violent crime rate in the state in 2023.

The party was advertised on social media and was planned to run from 3:00 p.m. to 6:00 p.m. PT. Between 80 and 100 people gathered at Monkey Space, an event venue at 1955 Lucile Avenue in unincorporated San Joaquin County just outside of Stockton city limits for a 2-year-old girl's birthday party. The venue had reportedly been booked in-person by the girl's mother rather than on Peerspace where it was listed.

== Shooting ==
San Joaquin County Sheriff's Office audio from initial response to shooting

Shortly before 6:00 p.m. PT, law enforcement were called to the event venue in response to a shooting. The shooting reportedly began just before the birthday cake was to be cut, and began inside the venue, where four of the victims were killed. Authorities believe the gunfire continued outside the venue and that there were multiple shooters.

A father of one of the slain victims reported that his son had been walking over to speak to the rapper MBNel when a masked gunman fired towards the rapper and struck his son once in the chest. Multiple survivors of the attack noted that the only slain adult was killed after hiding his girlfriend and several children inside a closet during the shooting. He was reportedly shot in the neck. Bullets shot during the attack also struck a nearby home and reportedly narrowly missed a man and a dog who were inside as the man worked on his garage door. The man hid with his girlfriend in a backyard shed.

Responding officers arrived at the event venue between six and seven minutes after the first calls came in. However, responding officers received the wrong location of the shooting and some initially responded to a Dairy Queen located next to the event venue. The first officers arrived at Thornton Plaza, where the Dairy Queen was located, in about four minutes.

== Victims ==
Four people were killed and 13 others were injured, including at least one critically. The victims were identified as 21-year-old Susano Archuleta, 14-year-old Amari Peterson, and 8-year-olds Maya Lupian and Journey Rose Reotutar Guerrero. A community activist, Jasmine Dellafosse, who has a mural in her honor in the city of Stockton, was also injured in the attack.

Dellafosse had previously interned for former Stockton mayor Michael Tubbs and had been inspired to begin community work after one of her best friends was murdered. Dellafosse was noted for her work organizing neighborhood clean-ups by high school-aged children, hosting parties and trunk-or-treating events, and improving playground equipment. The rapper MBNel, who may have been targeted in the attack, was also shot and went into hiding after the shooting.

== Investigation ==
The investigation is being led by the San Joaquin County Sheriff's Office, as it occurred within their jurisdiction, with assistance from the Federal Bureau of Investigation (FBI), Bureau of Alcohol, Tobacco, Firearms and Explosives (ATF), California Department of Justice, Stockton Police Department, San Joaquin County District Attorney's Office, and the U.S. Attorney's Office.

Investigators believe that the shooting was a targeted attack and that there may have been multiple shooters, but stopped short of saying that the attack was gang-related, although San Joaquin County sheriff Patrick Withrow did not rule it out. However, in parole documents for one of the arrested men, investigators alleged that multiple gang factions were present at the party. Stockton city leaders called the attack gang-related. Withrow said that interviews with witnesses and survivors of the attack did not yield much information about the descriptions of the assailants, but said that he understood that people's main priority was to stay alive. Withrow said he didn't "want to say" whether or not witnesses were withholding information, but said that he had "been hoping for more information on this right now". Investigators also located firearms on the roof of the venue, but had not determined if the firearms were used in the attack. In an update by the sheriff on December 9, he said over 50 shell casings were found at the scene, and they determined that at least five firearms were used and that they were working to determine if anyone at the party returned fire. Withrow also noted that witnesses said that the shooters wore face coverings and dark clothing, but that there was no information about possible getaway vehicles.

After the shooting, the FBI offered $50,000 for information that resulted in arrests or convictions. The ATF later offered an additional $25,000 in reward money. Two men who were present at the shooting, including the father of the child whose birthday was being celebrated, were arrested for suspicion of violating parole, but are not suspected to have been involved in the crime.

The arrested father was later charged with assault with a firearm, possession of an assault rifle, possession of high-capacity magazines, being a felon in possession of a firearm and ammunition, criminal street gang activity, domestic violence with corporal injury, ammunition violations, and numerous firearms and enhancement allegations, and a felony count of parole-revocation. The man had also previously admitted to being affiliated with the Sureños gang and was classified by Stockton police as being an active member of the Asian Boyz and Muddy Boyz gangs. The man was outfitted with a GPS ankle monitor as part of his parole and it indicated that he spent more than five hours at the event venue and additional time across the street. The local district attorney's office alleged that he had hosted the birthday party and knew that gang members would be in attendance at the party. The second man was identified as being an uncle of the child whose birthday was being celebrated was also a known rapper. The man was charged with violating the parole condition which prohibited him from being within 300 feet of places where children gather for convictions of child abuse, child endangerment and corporal injury from 2021. At the time of his arrest he was also wanted for failing to make a court appearance for charges for traffic violations. The man was also accused of violating part of his parole conditions which prohibited him from being in contact with known gang members, in this case his contact with the child's father. The man plead no contest to the parole violation and was sentenced to 180 days in jail with his defense attorney saying that he was in "no way" involved in the shooting nor did he have a relationship with the shooters, but that he just "wants to put this stuff behind him".

The name "Monkey Space" was not formally established and did not appear on state or county business license lists. The owner of the property that was being leased said that he had leased the property to Vertical Compass LLC, an umbrella company which ran several businesses at the location, for office space and video creative purposes and that the company running a banquet hall at the property was "illegal". On November 5, 2025, the county had received a complaint that a business at the location was operating without the necessary permits and they said that complaint was still under investigation. A spokesperson for the county said that the county had "never received a request to operate any business at that location", but the owner of Vertical Compass LLC disputed that. Vertical Compass LLC said that it had mistakenly sent a business application to the city of Stockton, but after realizing the mistake had applied as a non-profit through the county and got confirmation in October that the application was received.

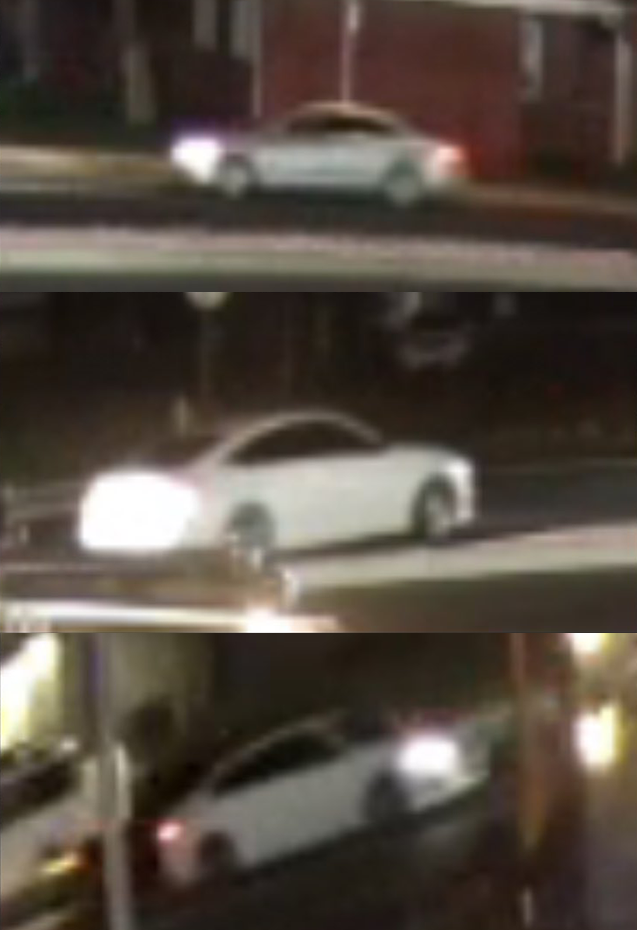
Two vehicles suspected to have been involved in the shooting

On January 17, 2026, the San Joaquin County Sheriff's Office released two surveillance photos of two vehicles they suspected to be involved with the shooting. The two photos showed a white and silver car. No license plates nor location of the vehicles in the photos were provided. The San Joaquin County Sheriff’s Office announced on February 4 that they had recovered the two vehicles, a white Honda Accord and a gray Volkswagen, and were processing them for evidence. On April 1, Withrow released an update about the investigation, stating that he was expecting arrests of suspects in "a couple of months" and that he was pleased with the proceeds of the investigation. Withrow also said that investigators were in the process of finishing a collection of digital evidence which would be submitted in a written report to the San Joaquin County District Attorney’s Office.

On September 10, the San Joaquin Sheriff's Office announced that it was close to handing the case over to the San Joaquin County District Attorney's Office, but that a few more pieces of evidence needed to be worked through in the hopes that suspects would be charged to the fullest extent possible.

== Reactions and aftermath ==
=== Community and business ===
The owner of the building said that he was aware that Vertical Compass LLC hosted small events at the property, but not large parties, and had never heard of the name "Monkey Space". The owner also said that he had told the owner of Vertical Compass LLC that he planned on ending his lease at the property prior to the shooting and said that there had not been any incidents at the location since he gained ownership of the property in 2018. After the shooting, the owner of Vertical Compass LLC said that he feared being caught up "gang politics" and was considering not reopening the business.

The woman who organized the party said that multiple of her family members and friends were shot during the incident, including her daughter's father whose two nieces were killed in the attack. The woman apologized to the attendees of the party and said that she "just wanted all my family to come together". The woman described seeing bleeding children on the floor after the attack and said that it caused her great pain. On December 19, 2025, MBNel broke his silence after going into hiding after the shooting in a social media post in which he expressed his condolences to the victims of the shooting.

A makeshift memorial was created with dozens of flower bouquets, candles and other items. Nonprofit organizations delivered clothes and food boxes, and offered mental health counseling. Singer-songwriter Burna Boy reached out to Stockton vice mayor Jason Lee and through him offered to cover the funeral costs of the slain victims. On December 3, 2025, two vigils were held to honor the victims killed in the attack. The first vigil was an annual vigil organized by the San Joaquin District Attorney's Office since 2002 to honor victims of violent crime which was held at Weber Point. Later the same day the Greater Christ Temple held a vigil near the site of the shooting which emphasized mental health support and unity among community members.

Stockton mayor Christina Fugazi and Stockton council member Mariela Ponce contributed to a $25,000 reward put forth by Stockton Crime Stoppers for information that led to an arrest or conviction of anyone involved in the attack. Stockton Crime Stoppers later increased their total reward to $55,000. A Texas-based non-profit, Youth Peace and Justice Foundation, which was created in response to the Uvalde school shooting in 2022, offered an additional $5,000 in reward money. The Youth Peace and Justice Foundation organized a meeting between four rival gangs in the area on December 12 in an attempt to negotiate a multi-gang ceasefire. The location of the meeting was kept a secret from the media and police and only involved gang members, non-profit members, and potentially a requested member of the clergy and a community leader. The non-profit said it achieved a 21-day "conditional epiphany truce" as a result of the meeting. The founder of the non-profit, Daniel Chaplin, commented after the meeting that "if Stockton's political leadership fails to match the moral courage of these drivers with institutional commitment by January 15th, they will bear the moral responsibility for any violence that resumes".

The San Joaquin County Sheriff's Office, Stockton Police Department, and city and county officials said that they had not received notice of the meeting from the non-profit. The sheriff's office released a statement in response to the meeting about how there was no verifiable information about how the ceasefire "would be monitored, enforced, or sustained, or if any agreement was in fact made". David M. Kennedy, a criminologist who specializes in crime prevention, said that ceasefires between gangs are not backed-up by evidence about their efficacy and that he doubted the ability of the non-profit to "parachute into a new city without having any background or any relationships" and stop the violence. The organization said it intended to participate in a city council meeting after the shooting, but failed to show up. At the meeting, mayor Christina Fugazi questioned the legitimacy of the non-profit and said that she believed the group was taking advantage of the shooting and that it was a "scam" and that they were attempting to take advantage of an $8 million grant being used to fund a violence prevention program, which the non-profit denied. The non-profit had previously attempted to publicly ally itself with vice mayor Jason Lee, but Lee said he didn't return the non-profit's calls because the ceasefire headline had "bypassed all the good work being done".

On December 28, 2025, less than a month after the shooting, 33-year-old Emmanuel Lopez, one of the survivors of the mass shooting, was shot and killed in Lodi in what investigators believed was possibly a gang-related attack. However, authorities said there was no indication that Lopez's death and the mass shooting were connected. Lopez's daughter had been shot in the head during the shooting, but survived, and Lopez said in an interview with the Los Angeles Times that he had held his friend, Susano Archuleta, as he died.

=== Political and government ===
The San Joaquin County sheriff, Patrick Withrow, urged witnesses to come forward with information about the attack and said that if people knew information about the crime, but did not come forward, they were "complacent" and believed the killing of children was acceptable behavior. Withrow and the San Joaquin County district attorney Ron Freitas attended a vigil for the victims of the attack. The Stockton Police Department hosted a firearm buyback event on December 13 after the shooting. The agency reported that it bought 277 firearms in exchange for cash gift cards and that the purpose of the event was to "collect firearms that were no longer wanted, prevent them from landing in the wrong hands and turning into crime guns if they are stolen during burglaries" and that the majority of the firearms were legally owned.

The mayor of Stockton, Christina Fugazi, described the attack as a terrorist act and an act of gang violence. Fugazi said in a statement that "the person or people responsible will lose their freedom for life" and that they would receive life sentences. After the attack, Fugazi said that the city had been cracking down on illegal firearms and had seized 752 guns so far in 2025, up from 610 in the same time period last year and that the city of Stockton had "approximately 5,000 gang members and 100 gangs". Fugazi requested federal assistance to combat violence within the city, saying that "we want to be their pilot site for the United States of America" and that the city was "ready with our arms open". Fugazi proposed "an anti-crime and human-development program" that would bring federal resources to the city from various federal agencies. However, Fugazi said that the request for assistance did not extend to the deployment of the National Guard in the city as she didn't want Stockton to experience the same unrest that Los Angeles had endured earlier that year.

Stockton's vice mayor, Jason Lee, called on the people responsible for the attack to turn themselves in and said "it’s never been gangsta to kill kids". Lee warned against people acting out in retaliation, reflecting on how his brother was murdered and how he had wanted to act out but didn't. Lee also implored anyone with information to speak to law enforcement. Later, Lee said the mayor and city council were partially to blame for the shooting, stating "when you don’t invest in communities like these, when you don’t prioritize the lives of young people, you put the bullets in the clip". Lee also lambasted the city council for delaying a vote to ban face coverings, which he introduced in June, saying that there was no reason for people to walk around in total face coverings in Stockton. Lee also criticized the city for not providing more funding to the city's Office of Violence Prevention, which he had advocated for during a budget meeting in June.

The first city council meeting since the shooting was held on December 9, 2025, and it was attended by many residents who demanded that the council take decisive action in response to the shooting. At the start of the meeting, Stockton mayor Christina Fugazi did not acknowledge the shooting or request a moment of silence, but vice mayor Jason Lee requested a moment of silence at the end of the meeting. The meeting was attended by Cleveland School Remembers president Niki Smith, whose group was formed by teachers of Cleveland Elementary School who witnessed a mass shooting at the school in 1989. Smith requested that the city council support the Office of Violence Prevention and to revive the defunct Advance Peace and Operation Ceasefire strategies. Council member Michele Padilla thanked residents for attending the meeting, but rejected any notion of the idea that the city council was not dedicated to making the city safer, saying "there were recent public statements implying that this council turned down prevention services, that we refused funding, and that is simply misleading". Lee responded to Padilla noting that the city council had declined to support his proposal to have the Office of Violence Prevention and Advance Peace enter a partnership after the former lost federal funding, that the council had failed to vote to ban face coverings, and that it had failed to apply for a state grant to renovate the Impact Teen Center into youth housing. The city council later unanimously approved an $8 million state grant aimed at reducing violence and recidivism, and provided funding for a violence prevention project called REDIRECT – Restorative Engagement and Diversion through Incarceration Reduction, Care & Treatment.

Representative Josh Harder, who represents the area, said that he and his wife were "devastated" by the news of the shooting. Harder said that families of the victims were "living through the worst possible pain right now" and that he had reached out to law enforcement about the shooting. California senators Alex Padilla and Adam Schiff also offered condolences and said that they were monitoring the situation. California governor Gavin Newsom described the attack as "horrific" and said that "no child should ever have their life taken from them". Newsom ordered flags at the Capitol to be flown at half-staff to honor the children killed in the attack. On December 24, 2025, Newsom announced the deployment of additional California Highway Patrol troopers to Stockton to combat crime and violence in the city, prompting positive responses from local leaders.

The California Victim Compensation Board (CalVCB), an agency within California Government Operations Agency, offered up to $70,000 in state assistance to the victims. A CalVCB spokesperson, Lynda Gledhill, urged victims of the shooting to reach out to the agency or to San Joaquin County's Victim-Witness advocates to receive compensation. The funds were made available to cover medical treatment, counseling, emotional support, and potential income loss caused by the shooting. The Stockton Unified School District released a statement after the shooting in which they said that counselors had been made available at all schools in the district.

On January 13, 2026, survivors and family members of survivors of gun violence from Stockton, including those present at the mass shooting, visited the California State Capitol where they spoke about their experiences and demanded action. Also present was state senator Jerry McNerney, who requested that the California legislature increase funding for crime victims and violence prevention and pass a $10 million one-time grant for family justice centers across the state. The father of victim Amari Peterson also spoke in a press conference at the Capitol where he described the impact of losing his son and expressed his frustration with the lack of progress in the investigation into the shooting.

== See also ==
- Stockton schoolyard shooting
- Stockton serial shootings
- Mass shootings in the United States
- List of shootings in California
- List of mass shootings in the United States in 2025
