= 2025 Leland shooting =

Mass shooting in Mississippi, U.S.

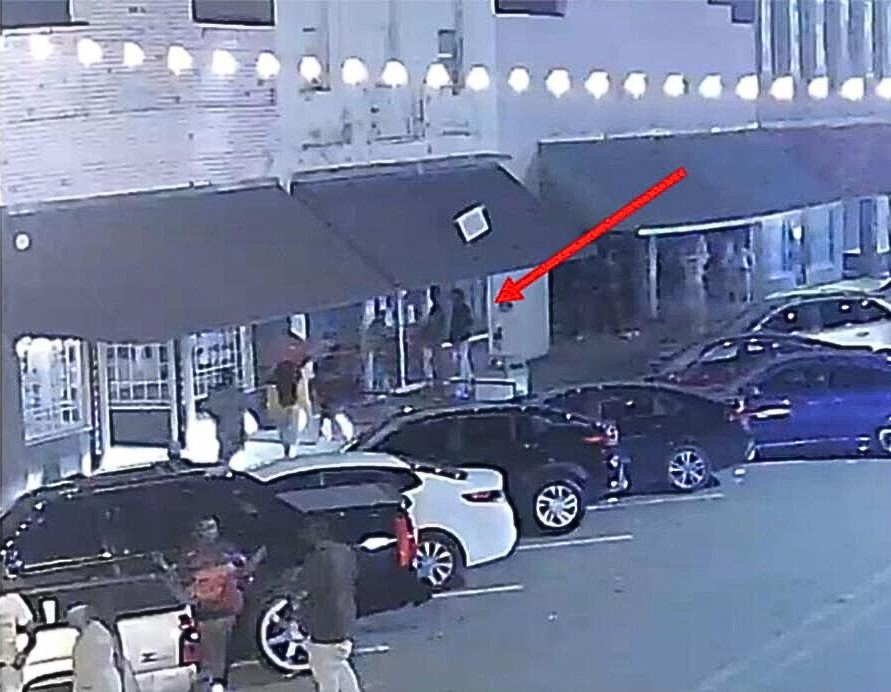
- One of the suspects (red arrow) before the shooting
- Location: 33.40654°N 90.89823°W; 400 N Main St; Leland, Mississippi, U.S.
- Date: October 10–11, 2025 c. 12:00 a.m. (CDT)
- Attack type: Mass shooting; shootout
- Deaths: 7
- Injuries: 19 (12 from gunfire)
- Motive: Dispute between several individuals (suspected)
- Charges: Capital murder (4 counts); Attempted murder (1 count)

On October 10–11, 2025, a mass shooting during a homecoming celebration occurred in Leland, Mississippi, United States. Seven people were killed, and nineteen others were injured, twelve of them by gunfire. Following the shooting, an investigation was conducted which resulted in nine arrests. It was the deadliest mass shooting in the United States in 2025.

The shooting was part of a series of unrelated shootings on the same weekend in the state in Heidelberg, Rolling Fork, Lorman, and in Jackson.

== Background ==
As of 2023, Mississippi had the second highest rate of deaths by firearm in the country, with 29.4 deaths per 100,000 people for a total of 844 fatalities. Only the nation's capital, Washington D.C., had a higher rate of firearm mortality.

Leland is a small city in Washington County, Mississippi, located in the Mississippi Delta region. From 2021 to 2024, Washington County had the second highest rate of gun homicides in the country, only behind the city of St. Louis, Missouri, with 68.6 gun homicides per 100,000 residents.

== Shooting ==
The shooting occurred overnight at around 12:00 a.m. CDT at the intersection of 4th Street and North Main Street, after people gathered on Main Street for the city's annual homecoming celebration following the Leland High School homecoming football game. The event draws large crowds of visitors and past residents to the city, and most of the victims were visiting from other towns.

It reportedly started due to a disagreement among several individuals which escalated into a shooting, though no official motive has been confirmed due to ongoing investigation. Several suspicious individuals carrying backpacks were reportedly seen earlier in the night in the same area the shooting occurred.

== Victims ==
Nineteen people were shot during the shooting. Seven people were killed, twelve were injured by gunfire, and a further seven people suffered non-gunshot injuries. Four victims were pronounced dead at the scene, while three others died later at hospitals in the region. The injured were transported to nearby medical facilities; four victims in critical condition were airlifted to Jackson for advanced treatment, and twelve others were treated at local hospitals in the area. None of the perpetrators were among the injured.

Six of the dead were all identified on October 12 by Washington County coroner LaQuesha Watkins, and another victim died from her injuries on October 17. Those killed were identified as: (Note: Attributed to multiple sources:)

Name	Age	Hometown
Oreshama Johnson	41	Leland
JaMichael Jones	34	Leland
Amos Brantley Jr.	18	Greenville
Kaslyn Johnson	18	Greenville
Calvin Plant	19	Greenville
Shelbyonna Powell	25	Greenville
Ebanee Williams	25	Rolling Fork

Brantley and Jones died the following morning, and Williams died on October 17. Williams’ body was identified by Hinds County Coroner Jeramiah Howard. Memorial services were held for the victims in their respective hometowns.

== Investigation ==
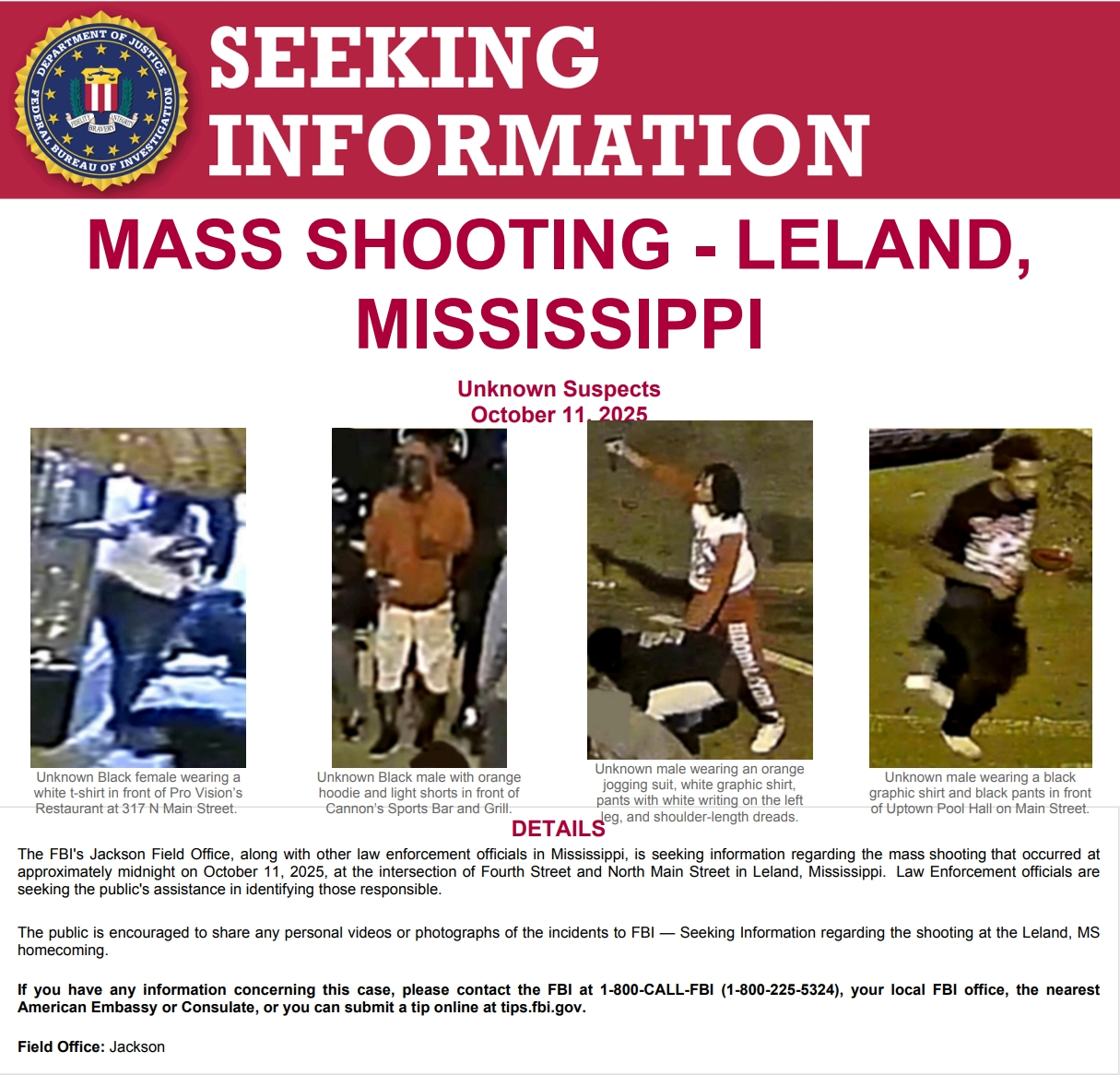
An FBI seeking information poster of the suspects

The Mississippi Bureau of Investigation (MBI) led the inquiry with assistance from the Federal Bureau of Investigation (FBI), local, and county law enforcement. The FBI established a digital media tip line into the shooting, and a $5,000 award was provided for information leading to any future arrests. The town had recently put in a surveillance camera on Main Street, and footage from the camera was used in the investigation.

=== Arrests ===
No arrests were announced immediately after the shooting. The FBI initially sought four suspects in connection to the shooting, three men and one woman. On October 13, the FBI announced that they had arrested Teviyon L. Powell and William Bryant, both aged 29, and Morgan Lattimore, aged 25, and had charged them with capital murder. A fourth person, 44-year-old Latoya A. Powell, was also arrested, but was charged with attempted murder. A spokesperson for the FBI also said that more arrests were expected. A day later, the FBI announced the arrest of 33-year-old Terrogernal Martin and charged him with capital murder. The agency also said that they were seeking three more suspects, two women and a man. It was also disclosed that Teviyon L. Powell and Latoya A. Powell were aunt and nephew, and that the deceased victim, Shelbyonna Powell, was Latoya's niece. On October 16, the FBI announced the arrest of four more suspects, but did not immediately release the identities of the new arrestees. One suspect has still not been arrested as of January 2026.

Martin's mother, Reseann Mitchell, stated that Martin was not involved in the shooting, but was working security at a building nearby and happened to brandish a weapon while looking for her. Mitchell also said that Martin and one of the victims, Shelbyonna Powell, were friends.

== Aftermath ==
Local police were assisted by county and state law enforcement during the emergency response. Following the attack, local officials imposed temporary curfews and canceled public events. Future events in Leland and the Delta area were provided with increased security measures in response to the shooting. State and community leaders expressed condolences to the victims' families and urged cooperation with investigators.

Leland marked the one year anniversary of the shooting with a memorial gathering on Fourth and Main Street, where the shooting took place. During the memorial, Leland mayor John Lee read from the Bible to the participants.

=== Additional shootings ===
External videos
- At least 6 dead after mass shooting after high school homecoming game

The shooting was part of a series of additional shootings that occurred in Mississippi on the same weekend during homecoming celebrations. In Heidelberg, located about 320 km (200 mi) southeast of Leland, a shooting during the local school's homecoming events left two people dead, and another man suffered fatal non-gunshot injuries. A second shooting took place in Rolling Fork, approximately 65 km (40 mi) south of Leland, during a football event at South Delta High School. Two people were reported injured in that incident, and two suspects were arrested and charged. Another two shootings occurred at universities in the state. At Alcorn State University's Lorman campus, officers responded to reports of shots fired near the Industrial Technology Building. Three people were shot, of whom a woman suffered fatal injuries, and no arrests were immediately made. Near Jackson State University's Mississippi Veterans Memorial Stadium, a child was shot in the abdomen after four cars were found damaged by a fire.

Police did not confirm any connection between the shootings, and the one that occurred in Leland.

== Responses ==
FBI Director Kash Patel posted on X that the agency is "mobilizing assets to assist local authorities in the case."

Mississippi Governor Tate Reeves posted on Facebook in reaction to the shootings in Heidelberg and Leland, calling the incidents "senseless acts of violence" and pledged that the perpetrators would be brought to justice.

Mayor John Lee commented that the shooting "affected every one of us" and called on people to come together and work towards a solution to "prevent anything like this from happening again". Lee also described the feeling in the city as "kind of numbness" in the immediate aftermath of the shooting. In November, Lee stated he has "been searching for ways to curb violence," and suggested implementing Flock Safety into the city.

Support services were provided for residents affected by the shooting from various groups, including online services from the FBI's Office for Victims of Crime (OVC), and counseling services from nearby Greenville. A vigil was held on October 13 for the victims of the shooting.

== See also ==
- Crime in Mississippi
- List of mass shootings in the United States
- 2025 Montgomery shooting, a mass shooting which also occurred after a football game a week earlier
- 2025 Saint Helena Island shooting, a mass shooting which also happened during high school celebrations a day later
