= 2025 River North shooting =

Mass shooting in Illinois, U.S.

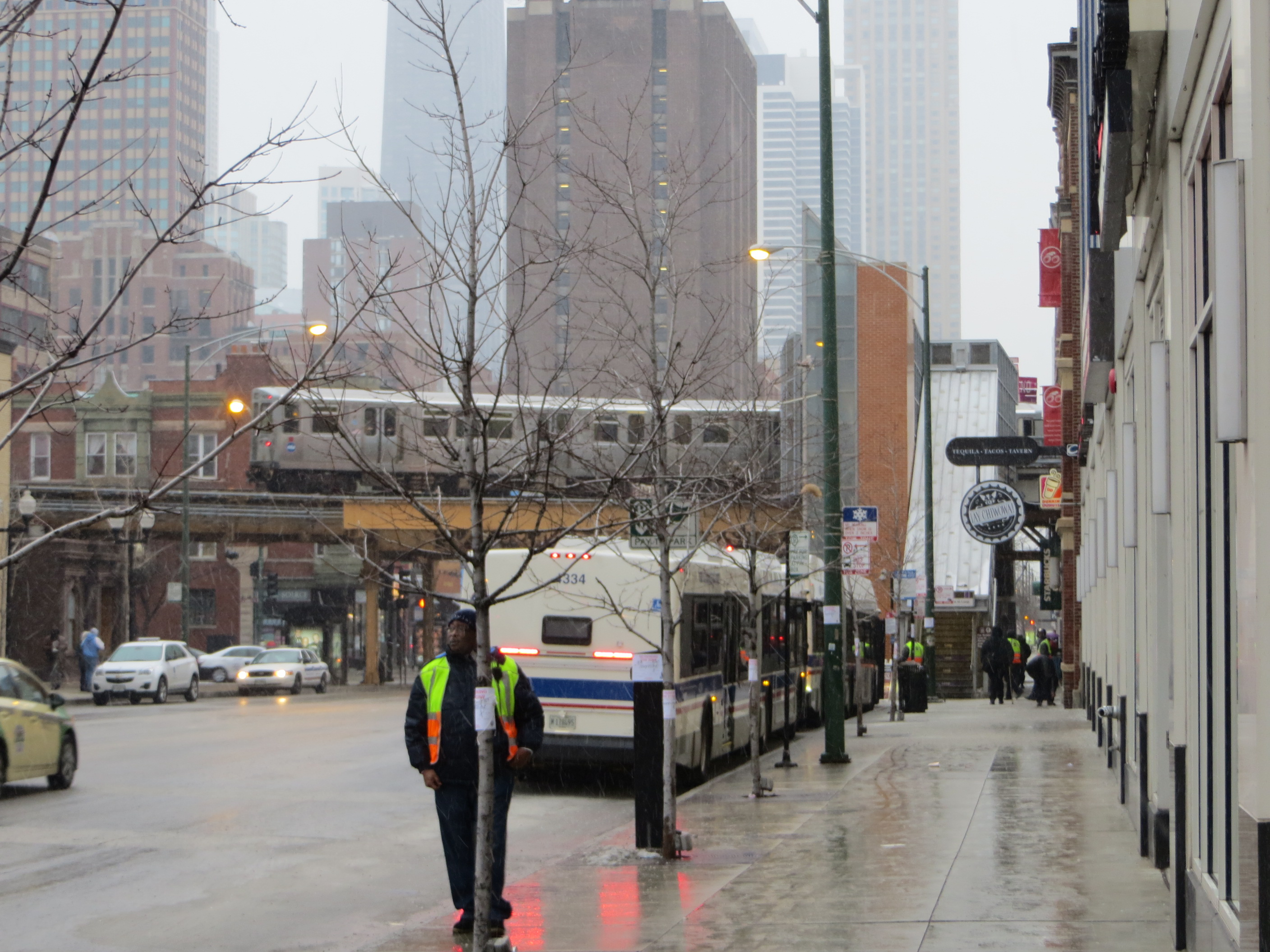
- The scene of the shooting pictured in 2013
- Location: 41.8965°N 87.6361°W; 311 West Chicago Avenue, Chicago, Illinois, U.S.
- Date: July 2, 2025 c. 11:00 p.m. – c. 11:05 p.m. (CDT; UTC−04:00)
- Target: Mello Buckzz
- Attack type: Mass shooting; drive-by shooting
- Weapons: Handgun (suspected), rifle (suspected)
- Deaths: 4
- Injuries: 14

On July 2, 2025, a mass drive-by shooting occurred in Chicago, Illinois, United States, in the city's River North neighborhood on the Near North Side. Four people were killed, and fourteen others were injured outside a nightclub. The shooting occurred during an album release party for rapper Mello Buckzz (born Melanie Doyle), who is the suspected target of the shooting.

== Shooting ==
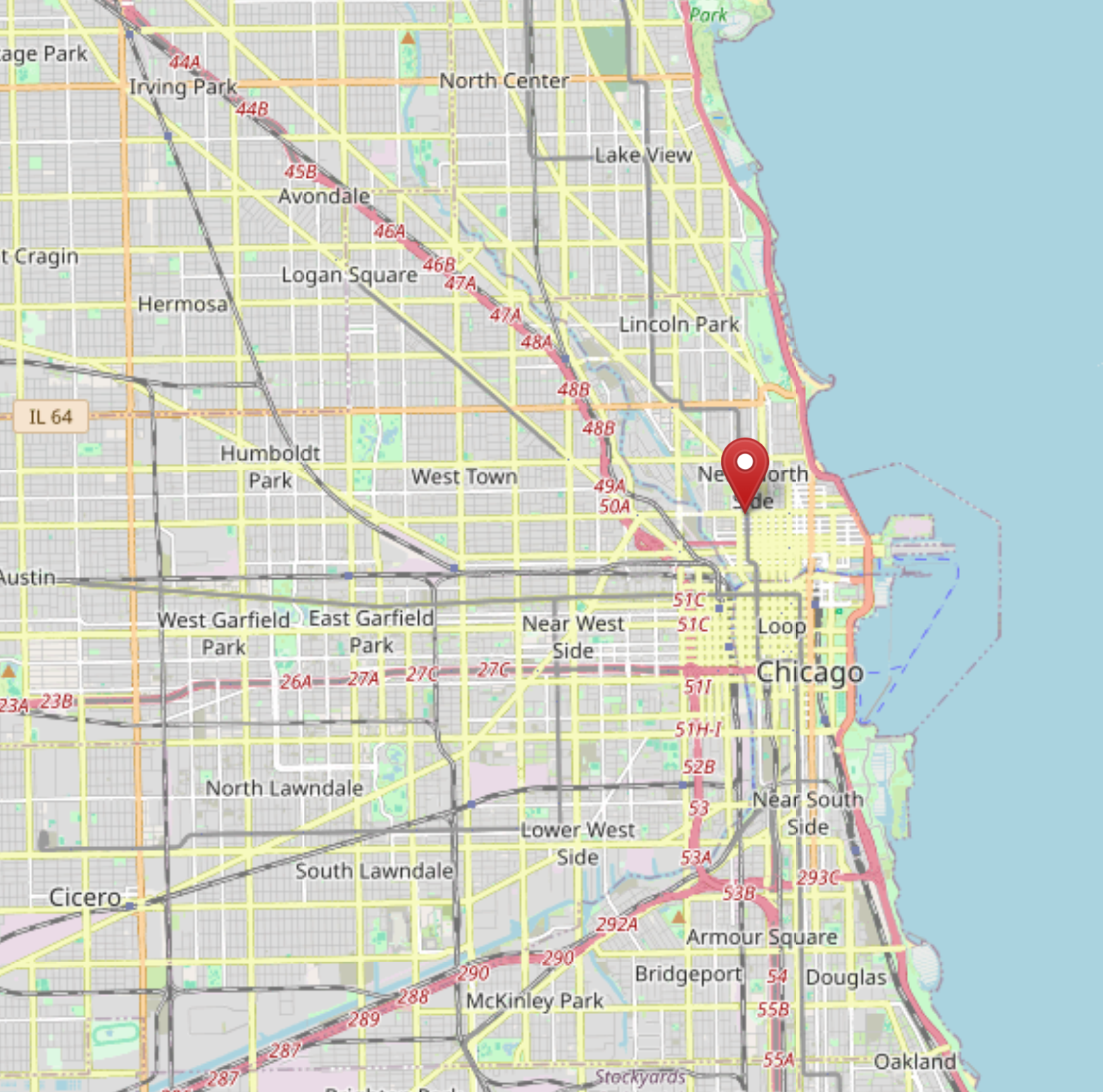
Location of the venue in Chicago

The shooting occurred at about 11 p.m. CDT (UTC−04:00), outside of a nightclub called Artis Restaurant and Lounge on the Near North Side neighborhood of Chicago. At the time of the shooting, the venue was hosting an album release party for local rapper Mello Buckzz. The shooting started when a black vehicle drove past the venue with at least one person shooting at a crowd of people who were leaving the venue. The length of the shooting was reported to have been brief. Four people were killed and fourteen others were injured. The New York Times reported that there might have been multiple shooters involved.

After the shooting ended, Chicago Police recovered handgun and rifle rounds and several shell casings inside and outside Artis. During investigations it was suspected that Mello Buckzz was the target of the shooting, however, she had already left Artis when the shooting began. Several people at the shooting recorded videos moments before and after the incident and posted them on social media.

A previous mass shooting occurred at the same address in 2022. By the next morning, the crime scene had been cleared.

== Victims ==
Victims were hospitalized at John H. Stroger Jr. Hospital of Cook County, Northwestern Memorial Hospital, Mount Sinai Medical Center and Advocate Illinois Masonic Medical Center. Three of the four fatalities were shot in the chest and were pronounced dead at Northwestern Memorial Hospital. The other fatality, a 25-year-old man, was shot in the head and pronounced dead at Stroger Hospital. One of the victims, 26-year-old Taylor Walker, was identified by WGN-TV a few hours after the shooting. Two of the victims were friends of Mello Buckzz. The following day, the identities of two other victims were confirmed: 25-year-old Leon Andrew Henry and 23-year-old Devonte Terrell Williamson. Another fatality was identified as 27-year-old Aviance King.

Fourteen people were injured, with four being critically wounded. The victims, both dead and wounded, were reported to be five men and thirteen women, aged 21 to 32. Mello Buckzz's boyfriend was reported to be one of the people shot, and was later confirmed to be Devonte Williamson, one of the slain.

== Aftermath ==
The following day, The Washington Post and The New York Times reported that no arrests had been made in the aftermath of the shooting.

In response to the shooting, Buckzz posted a statement on Instagram saying "Prayers up for all my sisters god please wrap yo arms around every last one of them" while confirming that two of the fatalities were friends of hers.

On July 3, Mayor Brandon Johnson and Chicago Police Superintendent Larry Snelling held a joint press conference. Johnson condemned the shooting and called on the city's residents to come forward with information while confirming that the suspects are still at large. Snelling also disclosed that two different caliber casings were found at the scene.

On August 25, the White House Office released an article showcasing the city's crime problem and highlighted the shooting as one of the justifications for a potential National Guard deployment to the city.

== See also ==
- List of mass shootings in the United States in 2025
- September 2024 Birmingham shooting, another targeted shooting that resulted in a mass shooting
