= 2025 UPMC Memorial Hospital shooting =

Mass shooting in Pennsylvania, U.S.

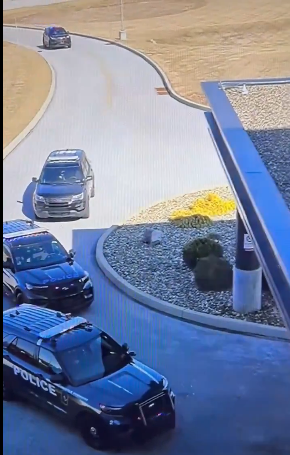
- A CCTV still of police responding to the hospital
- Location: 39°58′55″N 76°46′7″W; UPMC Memorial Hospital, Shiloh, Pennsylvania, U.S.
- Date: February 22, 2025; 10:35 – 11:13 a.m.
- Target: Staff
- Attack type: Mass shooting; hostage taking
- Weapon: 9mm Taurus semi-automatic pistol
- Deaths: 2 (including the perpetrator)
- Injuries: 7 (6 by gunfire)
- Perpetrator: Diogenes Archangel-Ortiz
- Motive: Anger and anguish after the death of his wife

On February 22, 2025, a mass shooting and hostage situation took place at UPMC Memorial Hospital in Shiloh, Pennsylvania, United States, near the city of York. The shooting began at around 10:35 a.m. when Diogenes Archangel-Ortiz took hostages at the intensive care unit (ICU) area of the hospital and opened fire on several people. Two people, including the shooter, were killed and seven others were injured.

== Background ==
UPMC Memorial Hospital is a 104-bed hospital operated by University of Pittsburgh Medical Center that opened in August 2019. It provides emergency medical, cardiology, vascular, chronic disease management, and surgical services.

== Shooting ==
Archangel-Ortiz entered the hospital at 10:30 a.m. carrying a backpack containing a semi-automatic pistol, zip ties and duct tape. He entered the ICU area of the hospital near the main entrance and opened fire after taking hostages at 10:35 a.m. Archangel-Ortiz then barricaded himself inside the hospital. He tried to shoot an employee three times in the head but ran out of ammunition. Later, when he came into the hallway holding a female ICU employee at gunpoint and with her hands restrained with zip ties, police officers and Archangel-Ortiz engaged in a shootout, in which he was fatally wounded. An officer was killed by friendly fire during the gunfire exchange. The attack was confirmed to be targeted.

== Victims ==
West York officer Andrew Duarte was killed in the shooting by gunshot injuries to the torso. It was later determined that he had been accidentally shot by another officer. His death was confirmed in a Facebook post by the West York Borough. Duarte was a law enforcement veteran and joined the police department in 2022 after working for five years with the Denver Police Department in Colorado as a patrol officer. Duarte was highly regarded according to the Denver Police Department and received a hero award in 2021.

Six people, three police officers, a doctor, a nurse, and a custodian were wounded but reported to be in stable condition. Another staff member was injured in a fall.

== Perpetrator ==
The perpetrator was identified as 49-year-old Diogenes Archangel-Ortiz, who had lived in York since the 1990s and was born in the Bronx, New York to Dominican parents. Archangel-Ortiz had an extensive criminal history across the York area between 2007 and 2025 prior to the shooting. According to his ex-girlfriend, he also had lifelong mental health issues and was experiencing depression at the time of the shooting. Archangel-Ortiz previously had contact with the ICU and went to the hospital at least once before the attack and the week prior to the shooting he had contacted ICU for a medical purpose that had involved his wife. Archangel-Ortiz had been removed from the hospital by security the night before the shooting after his wife died in hospice earlier that night. Anger and grief were identified as motives for the shooting.

== Aftermath ==
A memorial with flowers and mementos was set up on the steps of the police department in West York. Governor Josh Shapiro ordered national and state flags to be flown at half-mast across Pennsylvania in honor of Duarte. A funeral service for Duarte was held on February 28. Hundreds of police officers and Governor Shapiro attended the service.

The Occupational Safety and Health Administration opened up an investigation into the shooting on the same day it happened and it has six months to complete the investigation.

In April 2025, a UPMC hospital spokesperson announced that the security at UPMC facilities will be enhanced, which will include metal detectors.

On June 13, 2025, the hospital named the intensive care unit after Duarte and placed a plaque outside that recognizes his bravery and his sacrifice.

On June 14, 2025, country artist Justin Moore headlined the "Fields of Honor" concert at the Inch & Co. farm in York County to honor the memory of Duarte and benefit UPMC Memorial Hospital staff. All of the money raised will be used for two purposes: to create an Officer Andrew Duarte Memorial Shooting Range and Simulation Room to help equip police for crisis situations and to make a healing room for the well-being of UPMC Memorial Hospital staff.

== See also ==
- List of filmed mass shootings
- List of mass shootings in the United States in 2025
- List of law enforcement officers killed in the line of duty in the United States
- 2025 North Codorus Township shooting, another mass shooting in the same county later the same year
