= San Joaquin County Sheriff's Office =

Law enforcement agency in California

- Abbreviation: SJCSO

Agency overview
- Formed: 1849
- Employees: 796 (2024)

Jurisdictional structure
- Operations jurisdiction: San Joaquin County, California, United States
- Area: 1,426 square miles (3,690 km^{2})
- Population: 139,662 (2024)

Operational structure
- Headquarters: 7000 Michael Canlis Blvd French Camp, CA 95231
- Deputies: 335 (2024)
- Unsworn Members: 220
- Agency executives: Patrick Withrow, Sheriff; Brian Barnes, Undersheriff

Website
- https://www.sjsheriff.org/

The San Joaquin County Sheriff's Office provides police services for San Joaquin County, California. Established in 1849, the current sheriff is Patrick Withrow, who heads a department of over 700 sworn and support personnel. Withrow replaced multi-term sheriff Steve Moore in 2019.

== History ==
In 1999, Wesley Shermantine and Loren Herzog were arrested by the sheriff's office and subsequently convicted of four murders. They were dubbed the Speed Freak Killers, due to their long history of methamphetamine use. In 2012 Shermantine began to reveal the location of the bodies of his victims. His maps led the sheriff to a secret graveyard near Linden. The number of body fragments found at the site has forced police agencies to reevaluate how many may have been killed by the pair.

=== Misconduct and Controversies ===
On 20 October 1989, Detective Dighton Little, SWAT team member, was shot by a suspect during a joint raid conducted with the Stanislaus County Sheriff's Department. Little broke a window and was shot by the resident, Richard Elsass. The other members of the team then killed Elsass. Police found no evidence of any crime at the location. In 1994 the Elsass family was paid $175,000.

Sheriff Baxter Dunn, former deputy Monte McFall, and other county officials were indicted on federal corruption charges in 2003. All except McFall took plea deals: Dunn served six months at Taft Correctional Institution. His conviction was overturned in 2011. McFall was sentenced to ten years in federal prison, but part of his conviction was overturned, reducing the sentence to 6 1/2 years.

In 2017, famed pathologist and physician Bennet Omalu resigned as chief medical examiner alleging routine egregious interference in postmortem examinations by then Sheriff Steve Moore (who doubled as coroner) to protect law enforcement officers who killed people. Omalu's resignation was followed soon by other staff who made similar allegations
