= 2025 Montgomery shooting =

Mass shooting in Alabama, U.S.

- Location: 32°22′44.2272″N 86°18′38.574″W; Montgomery, Alabama, U.S.
- Date: October 4, 2025 c. 11:30 p.m. (EDT)
- Attack type: Mass shooting; shootout
- Deaths: 2
- Injuries: 12
- Charges: Capital murder; Attempted murder; Additional probation violation

On October 4, 2025, two people were killed and 12 others were injured when two groups of people opened fire on each other in a crowd in Downtown Montgomery, Alabama, United States.

As of November 7, 2025, four people have been charged with capital murder or attempted murder and a fifth person was arrested on a non-violent gun charge in connection to the incident.

== Background ==
As of 2023, Alabama had the fourth highest rate of deaths by firearm in the country, with 25.6 deaths per 100,000 people for a total of 1,292 fatalities. Only fellow southern states Louisiana and Mississippi and the nation's capital, Washington D.C., had a higher rate of firearm mortality.

At the time of the attack, the downtown area of Montgomery was "crowded" due to visitors being in the city for the annual Alabama National Fair and a college football game between HBCU rivals Tuskegee Golden Tigers and Morehouse Maroon Tigers, which had recently concluded when gunfire broke out. Multiple attractions, including a Ferris wheel, were set up throughout downtown for the fair.

== Shooting ==
At approximately 11:30 p.m., rival gunmen, believed to be targeting one of the victims, opened fire at each other in a crowd in Downtown Montgomery near the intersection of Bibb Street and Commerce Street. One person is believed to have opened fire first, prompting multiple people to pull out firearms and return fire.

Police patrols were within 50 ft (15 m) of the location of the incident when gunfire broke out and quickly responded, but no one was taken into custody for the incident at the scene.

== Victims ==
Fourteen people were shot in the incident, of whom two were killed. The deceased victims were identified as Montgomery residents Jeremiah Morris, aged 17, and Shalanda Williams, aged 43. Five surviving victims suffered life-threatening injuries and seven of the victims were under the age of 20, with the youngest victim being 16 years of age. On October 15, two of the five critically wounded victims were upgraded from life-threatening condition.

== Investigation ==
Multiple individuals were suspected of opening fire in the crowd, but no suspects were immediately apprehended. A $50,000 reward was offered by Montgomery mayor Steven Reed for information that helps lead to the arrest of a suspect. Montgomery police chief James Graboys said that he believed one of the victims was targeted in the attack. Graboys also explained that the police department was working with the Alabama Law Enforcement Agency (ALEA), Federal Bureau of Investigation (FBI), and the Bureau of Alcohol, Tobacco, Firearms and Explosives to identify and arrest the suspects.

On October 10, a juvenile boy was arrested in connection to the shooting and held at the Montgomery County Detention Facility. The suspect was charged with one count of capital murder, nine counts of assault in the first degree, and three counts of assault in the second degree. Three days later, a 19-year-old man was arrested, received the same charges and was booked into the same detention facility. On October 16, another 19-year-old man was arrested and charged with attempted murder in connection to the shooting and was booked into the same facility. He was accused of shooting at a juvenile victim and critically wounding him. A day later, a 21-year-old man was taken into custody in connection to the shooting and received the same charges as the juvenile.

On October 20, one suspect was released after making a $60,000 bond. He had been given the highest possible bond and the bond was not subject to Aniah's Law, a state law which allows judges to deny bond to certain people accused of violent crimes. Aniah's Law was created in response to and named after Aniah Blanchard, who in 2019 was allegedly abducted and killed by a man out on bond for several other violent crimes at the time. The Montgomery County District Attorney filed a motion to have the bond increased after his release, arguing that he poses a danger to the community and that the previous bond was inadequate, citing that he was in possession of a firearm equipped with an extended magazine and Glock switch at the time of his arrest. On November 4, a judge ruled that the released suspect's bond could not be increased and disputed that he had been in possession of a weapon equipped with a Glock switch at the time of his arrest.

On November 7, a 22-year-old man was arrested and charged with violating his prohibition on having possession of a firearm in connection to the incident. However, he was not charged with using a firearm during the shooting. In addition to his charge related to the shooting, he was accused of robbery and two counts of theft of property for an unrelated incident on September 29.

== Reactions and aftermath ==
=== Local ===
Montgomery mayor Steven Reed said that those who were responsible were not reflective of Montgomery and vowed that he would make examples out of the perpetrators. Reed also rejected the idea of deploying the Alabama National Guard to combat crime, stating that he did not believe it was an effective use of the guard and that he believed that "law enforcement professionals can handle that along with our community leaders and other initiatives we have going on that are already showing progress in that area".

After a suspect's release on bond on October 20, Reed and Montgomery police chief James Graboys expressed their frustration with the suspect being allowed to be released. Reed called the low bond "a slap in the face" and called on state officials to pass bond reform legislation. Meanwhile, Graboys called the suspect's release "a serious, ongoing concern" and cited multiple examples of people being out on bond for violent crimes being re-arrested for other serious offenses and expressed support for expanding Aniah's Law, a state law which allows judges to deny bail to certain violent felony offenders.

On October 7, the Montgomery City Council voted unanimously to suspend the downtown's entertainment district designation indefinitely in the wake of the shooting after hearing concerns from local business owners about the economic impact of violence in the area. Councilman Andrew Szymanski cited the lack of enforcement of a city ordinance which requires alcoholic beverages to be carried in designated green cups in entertainment districts as a cause for violence in the downtown area. The council also announced that they would discuss the implementation of a citywide youth curfew at the following council meeting.

On October 15, local business leaders and city officials met to address measures to be taken in response to the shooting. Business owners and police officers said that they would be more strict with stopping loitering, stopping people from carrying backpacks into businesses, and the carrying of weapons. They also discussed increasing the number of police foot patrols through the district and increasing the visibility of those foot patrols.

=== State ===
Alabama governor Kay Ivey condemned the attack, commenting that "Alabamians lost their lives at the hands of thugs in downtown Montgomery this weekend." Ivey said that she was looking to deploy Capitol troopers to key downtown areas and called on Alabama lawmakers to pass legislation which would provide additional resources for state law enforcement downtown. She also added that "It is clear that to have a safe Montgomery, it is going to take more than these steps." Montgomery mayor Reed said that he was in favor of additional state assistance, but said that lax gun laws had "taken critical tools away from police officers".

After the release of a suspect on August 20, Ivey called on Alabama voters to vote in favor of the expansion of Aniah's Law in the next statewide primary election on May 19, 2026. Alabama state senator Will Barfoot sponsored an expansion to Aniah's Law which would add solicitation or an attempt or conspiracy to commit murder to the list of crimes that allow judges to deny bonds to people accused of crimes.

The attorney general of Alabama, Steve Marshall, said that city officials refused to admit that there was an ongoing crime crisis in the city, stating, "Though the blame lies with those who carelessly pulled the triggers, I continue to be troubled by the city leadership’s stubborn refusal to acknowledge that they have a serious problem". Montgomery mayor Reed responded to Marshall's comments by stating that he'd "be more than happy" to discuss with him the city's anti-crime initiatives, but that he didn't appreciate Marshall "lecturing" him about crime in the city and that he believed the downtown area was very safe.

Alabama governor Kay Ivey requested the Alabama Alcoholic Beverage and Control Board (AABCB) to propose potential changes regarding alcohol policy to improve public safety after the shooting. AABCB administrator Curtis Stewart penned a letter to Ivey in which he said that the AABCB would consider prohibiting liquor stores in entertainment districts from selling cups and ice and imposing a limit on the amount of alcohol that special retail licensees were allowed to sell for off-premise consumption by customers. Stewart also suggested the Alabama Legislature consider passing legislation which would impose curfews on minors in entertainment districts, restrict giveaways of alcohol during events in entertainment districts by public entities, and to allow the state to suspend or terminate entertainment district designations if public safety standards were believed to not be met.

Two new initiatives were conducted by the ALEA to curb crime in Montgomery at the direction of Ivey. The first was the creation of a new patrol unit, dubbed "Troop Zero", which complimented local police officers in patrolling "Montgomery’s busiest corridors, such as Interstate 65 and Interstate 85. A spokesperson for the ALEA said that the patrol unit's task was to "provide a safe environment for citizens and visitors by offering courteous service, enforcing traffic laws and showing zero tolerance for dangerous or criminal behavior" and thanked Ivey for her "steadfast commitment to public safety". The second initiative was an expansion of ALEA's Capitol Police Unit's patrol area from just the area surrounding the Alabama State Capitol to key downtown entertainment locations. The ALEA also engaged in 12 days of "targeted enforcement within the expanded downtown area", during which they recorded 1,121 traffic enforcement arrests (a combined number of traffic stops and citations issued), two felony arrests, one DUI arrest, and 2,197 total citizen contacts, the latter of which consists of foot patrol engagement, assistance and community interaction.

=== National ===
Alabama senator Tommy Tuberville said that he was deeply disturbed by the attack and claimed that crime was rampant in Montgomery. He called on "city leadership to take responsibility and put an end to this". Alabama senator Katie Britt referenced the attack during a Senate oversight hearing with U.S. attorney general Pam Bondi, calling the shooting "horrific". Britt questioned Bondi about her interagency work in order to "find solutions" to preventing similar crimes. Bondi responded by saying that they were "working nonstop to combat crime" and that the ongoing federal government shutdown had made work more difficult, but that agents were continuing to investigate.

Tuberville reacted strongly to the release of a shooting suspect on bond, stating that officials were "failing our communities and the victims' families by allowing violent criminals to post bail and roam our streets". Tuberville also said that he had spoken to Kash Patel, the director of the FBI, and that Patel was planning on sending agents to Montgomery in order to support law enforcement activities in the city.

== See also ==
- September 2024 Birmingham shooting, another Alabama shooting incident involving multiple gunmen
- Tuskegee University shooting, a 2024 shooting at Tuskegee University
- 2025 Leland shooting, another mass shooting during post-game festivities
