= Carrollton Ridge, Baltimore =

Coordinates: 39°17′0″N 76°38′58″W

Carrollton Ridge
- Neighborhood of Baltimore
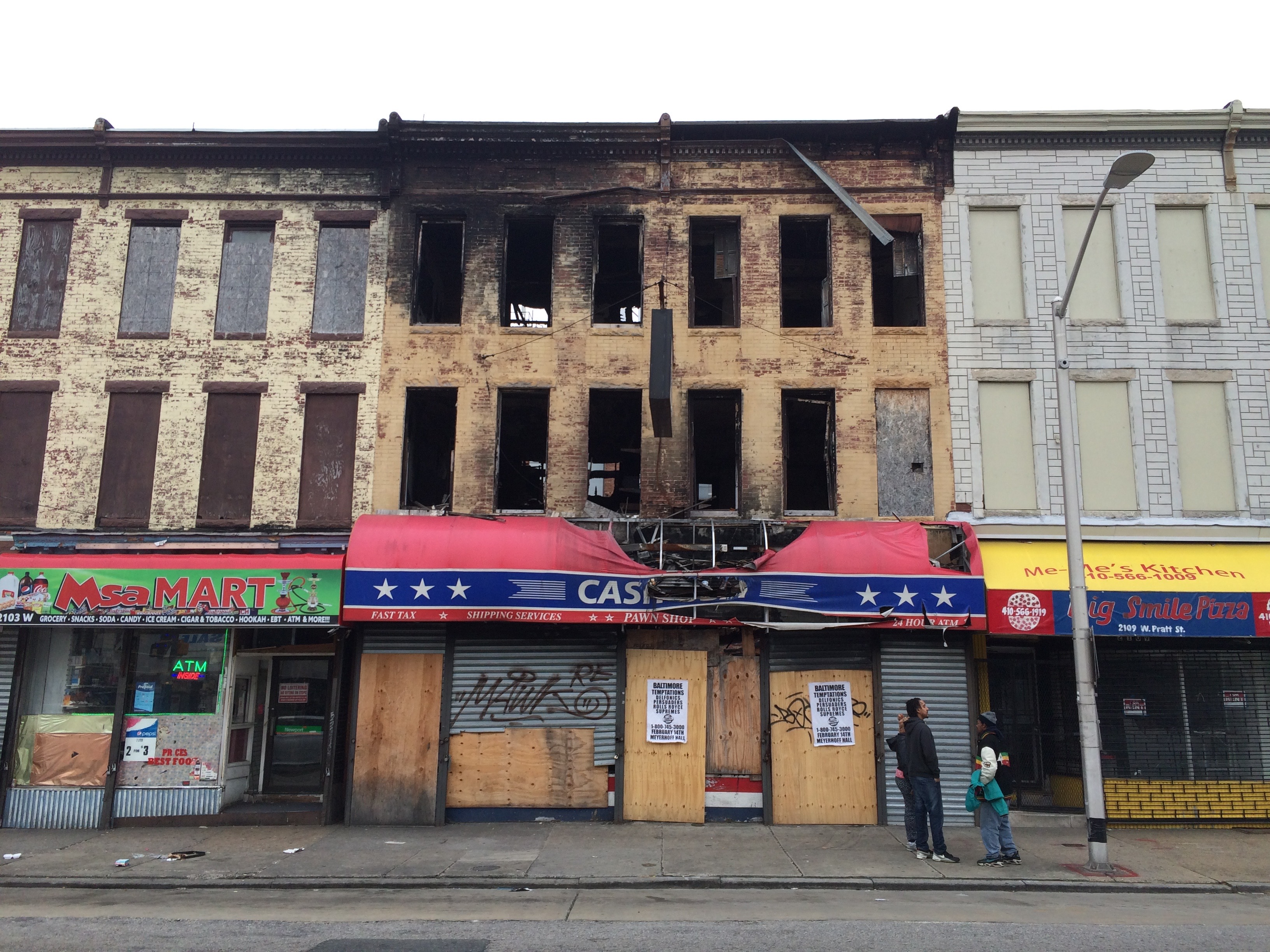
- Row of vacant commercial buildings on the 2000 block of W. Pratt Street in Carrollton Ridge, Baltimore

- Location within Baltimore
- Country: United States
- State: Maryland
- City: Baltimore
- Time zone: UTC-5 (Eastern)
  - Summer (DST): EDT
- ZIP code: 21223
- Area code: 410, 443, and 667

Carrollton Ridge is a neighborhood of South Baltimore, Maryland, United States

The area currently known as Carrollton Ridge is a low income residential neighborhood directly west of Baltimore's Inner Harbor. Its boundaries are roughly defined by Frederick Avenue to the north, Carroll Park to the south, Bentalou Street to the west and Fulton Avenue to the east. The neighborhood is racially diverse, though predominantly African American. The homes in Carrollton Ridge are mostly rowhouses.

Carrollton Ridge derived its name from two things. First, Dr. Charles Carroll, and his estate (a 117-acre (0.47 km^{2}) remnant of which currently exists as Carroll Park). Second, the geographic ridge which runs alongside the western edge of the neighborhood.

Carrollton Ridge is home to Ohio Ave., which at approximately 25 feet long has one residential address, making it the world's shortest residential street according to the Guinness Book of World Records.

As of 2022, there were nearly 800 vacant homes in the neighborhood, mostly being those unfit for human residence.
