= Peerspace =

Peer-to-peer marketplace for venue rentals

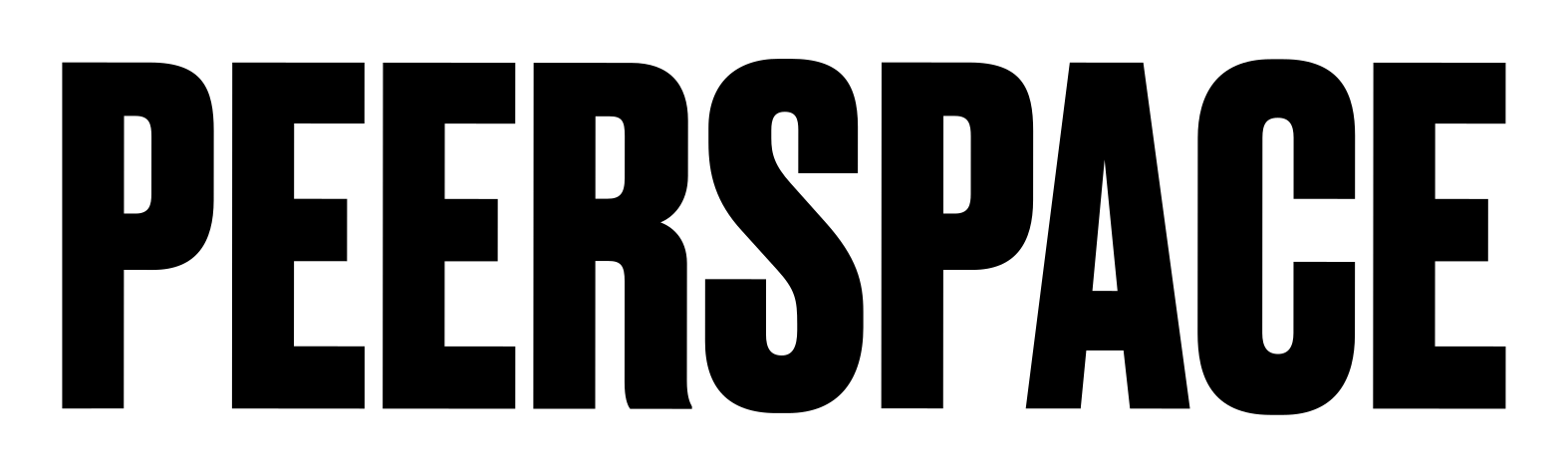
- Company type: Private
- Founded: 2014; 12 years ago in San Francisco, California
- Founders: Rony Chammas; Matt Bendett
- Headquarters: San Francisco
- Area served: Global
- Key people: Eric Shoup (CEO 2018-2024); Kevin Yuann (CEO 2024-)
- Products: Venue rental platform
- Website: www.peerspace.com

Peerspace is a company operating an online marketplace for hourly venue rentals for meetings, productions, and events. The company was founded in San Francisco by Rony Chammas and Matt Bendett, with backers including GV and Foundation Capital. The company lists 40,000 spaces across North America, Europe, and Australia.

== History ==
Peerspace was founded in 2014 in San Francisco, California by Rony Chammas and Matt Bendett with the intention of becoming a B2B version of Airbnb offering rentals of productive places. The idea originated while Chammas was a student at NYU Stern School of Business and needed to find meeting places for various student organizations he was a part of. Peerspace venues are designed for events unlike Airbnb which bans disruptive events. Structure Capital led a $1.5 million seed funding round. Chammas and Bendett, his co-founder, previously worked together at Electronic Arts (EA).

Following its 2014 launch in San Francisco, Peerspace expanded to Los Angeles and then to New York City in November 2015. The expansion to New York City coincided with a $5 million series A round of capital led by Foundation Capital. In January 2016, the company launched in Seattle. Two years later, in 2018, GV led a $16 million series B round.

The company began its international expansion in 2021, launching in Canada and the United Kingdom. By December 2022, it had more than 2000 hosts active in London. It launched in France and Australia in 2022, and rebranded a year later. By 2024, the company was profitable with $100 million in revenue from $500 million in turnover.

== Operations ==
Peerspace is a two-sided marketplace operating a website and mobile apps that allow businesses to rent out locations to other businesses or individuals. The marketplace allows hosts to set hourly rental rates and booking terms while taking 15% of the booking cost and providing liability insurance. Users are connected to spaces including art galleries, lofts, rooftops, and other venues.

Eric Shoup became CEO of the company in 2018. In 2024, Shoup was replaced as CEO by Kevin Yuann.
