= Geography of Halloween =

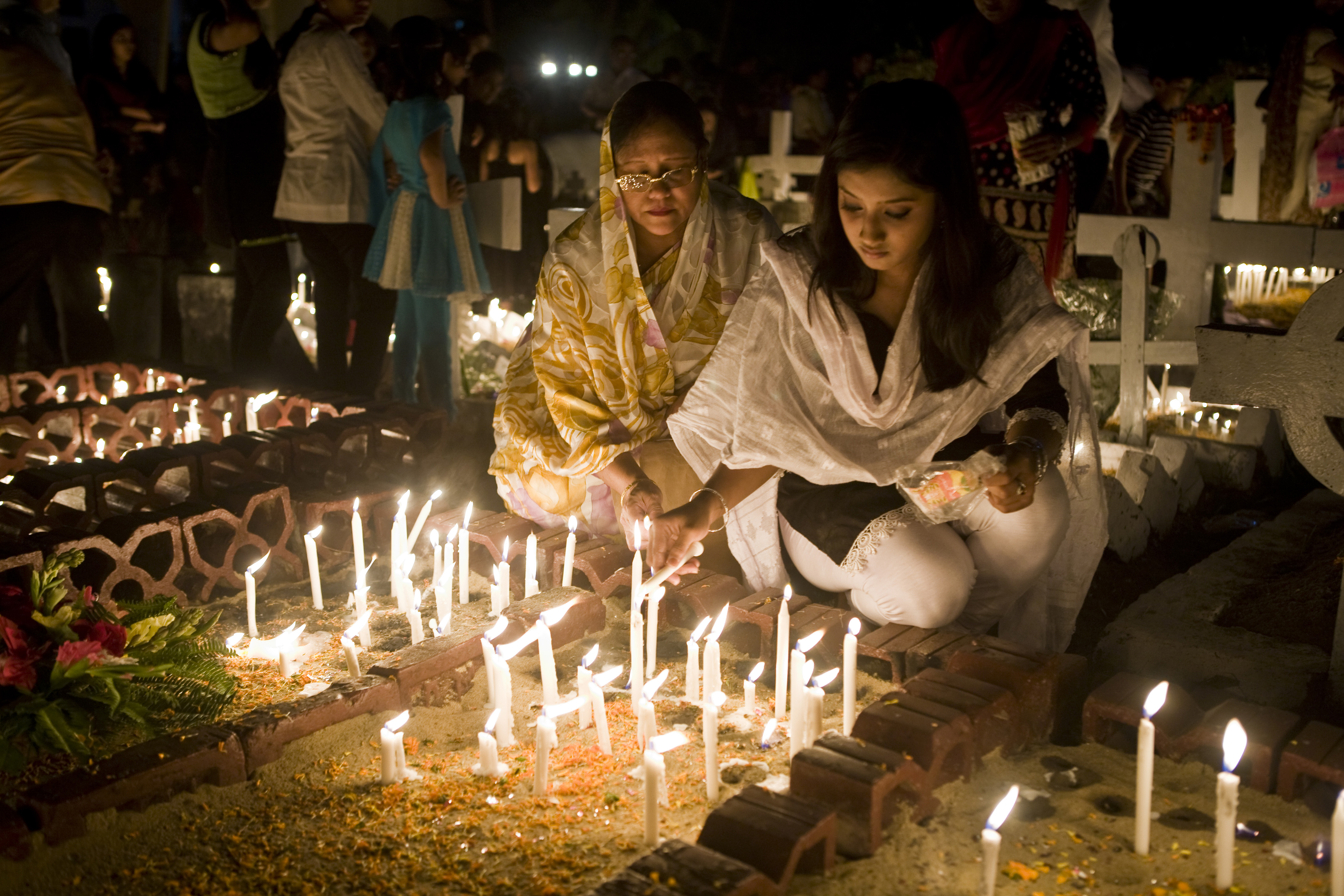
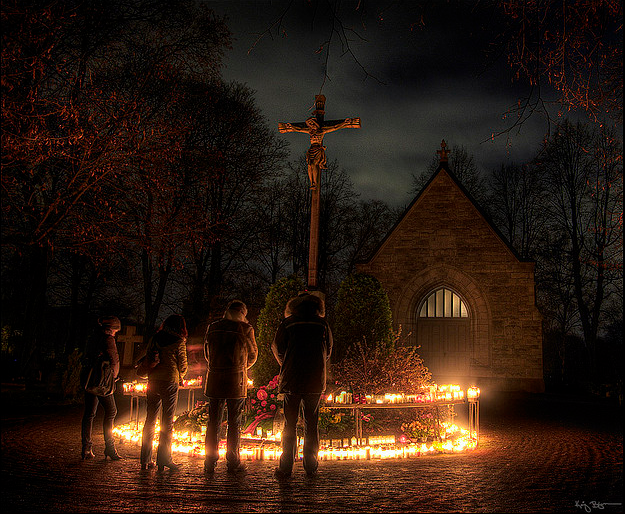
On All Hallows' Eve, Christians in some parts of the world visit graveyards to pray and place flowers and candles on the graves of their loved ones. Left: Christians in Bangladesh lighting candles on the headstone of a relative. Right: Lutheran Christians praying and lighting candles in front of the central crucifix of a graveyard.

Halloween is a celebration observed on October 31, the day before the feast of All Hallows, also known as Hallowmas or All Saints' Day. The celebrations and observances of this day occur primarily in regions of the Western world, albeit with some traditions varying significantly between geographical areas.

== Origins ==
Halloween is the eve of vigil before the Western Christian feast of All Hallows (or All Saints) which is observed on November 1. This day begins the triduum of Hallowtide, which culminates with All Souls' Day. In the Middle Ages, many Christians held a folk belief that All Hallows' Eve was the "night where the veil between the material world and the afterlife was at its most transparent".

== Americas ==
=== Canada ===
Scottish emigration, primarily to Canada before 1870 and to the United States thereafter, brought the Scottish version of the holiday to each country. The earliest known reference to ritual begging on Halloween in English speaking North America occurs in 1911 when a newspaper in Kingston, Ontario reported that it was normal for the smaller children to go street "guising" on Halloween between 6 and 7 p.m., visiting shops, and neighbours to be rewarded with nuts and candies for their rhymes and songs. Canadians spend more on candy at Halloween than at any time apart from Christmas. Halloween is also a time for charitable contributions. Until 2006 when UNICEF moved to an online donation system, collecting small change was very much a part of Canadian trick-or-treating. Quebec offers themed tours of parts of the old city and historic cemeteries in the area. In 2014 the hamlet of Arviat, Nunavut moved their Halloween festivities to the community hall, cancelling the practice of door-to-door "trick or treating", due to the risk of roaming polar bears. In British Columbia it is a tradition to set off fireworks at Halloween.

=== United States ===
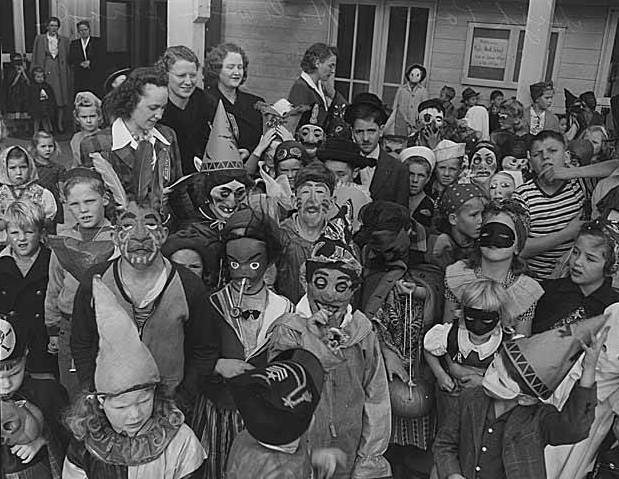
Children in Halloween costumes at High Point, Seattle, 1943

In the United States, Halloween did not become a holiday until the 19th century. The transatlantic migration of nearly two million Irish following the Great Irish Famine (1845–1849) brought the holiday to the United States.

American librarian and author Ruth Edna Kelley wrote the first book length history of the holiday in the U.S., The Book of Hallowe'en (1919), and references souling in the chapter "Hallowe'en in America": "All Hallowe'en customs in the United States are borrowed directly or adapted from those of other countries. The taste in Hallowe'en festivities now is to study old traditions, and hold a Scotch party, using Robert Burns's poem Halloween as a guide; or to go a-souling as the English used. In short, no custom that was once honored at Hallowe'en is out of fashion now." The main event for children of modern Halloween in the United States and Canada is trick-or-treating, in which children, teenagers, (sometimes) young adults, and parents (accompanying their children) disguise themselves in costumes and go door-to-door in their neighborhoods, ringing each doorbell and yelling "Trick or treat!" to solicit a gift of candy or similar items. Teenagers and adults will more frequently attend Halloween-themed costume parties typically hosted by friends or themed events at nightclubs either on Halloween itself or a weekend close to the holiday. According to the National Retail Federation, As of 2006,the most popular Halloween costume themes for adults are, in order: witch, pirate, vampire, cat, and clown.

At the turn of the 20th century, Halloween had turned into a night of vandalism, with destruction of property and cruelty to animals and people. Around 1912, the Boy Scouts, Boys Clubs, and other neighborhood organizations came together to encourage a safe celebration that would end the destruction that had become so common on this night.

The commercialization of Halloween in the United States did not start until the 20th century, beginning perhaps with Halloween postcards (featuring hundreds of designs), which were most popular between 1905 and 1915. Dennison Manufacturing Company (which published its first Halloween catalog in 1909) and the Beistle Company were pioneers in commercially made Halloween decorations, particularly die-cut paper items. German manufacturers specialised in Halloween figurines that were exported to the United States in the period between the two World Wars.

Halloween is now the United States' second most popular holiday (after Christmas) for decorating; the sale of candy and costumes is also extremely common during the holiday, which is marketed to children and adults alike. The National Confectioners Association (NCA) reported in 2005 that 80% of American adults planned to give out candy to trick-or-treaters. The NCA reported in 2005 that 93% of children planned to go trick-or-treating. Each year, popular costumes are dictated by various current events and pop culture icons. On many college campuses, Halloween is a major celebration, with the Friday and Saturday nearest 31 October hosting many costume parties. Other popular activities are watching horror movies and visiting haunted houses. Total spending on Halloween is estimated to be $8.4 billion. An Associated Press survey found that 66% of American parents planned to take their children trick or treating. Within the survey, 46% identified as Protestant and 24% as Catholic.

==== Events ====
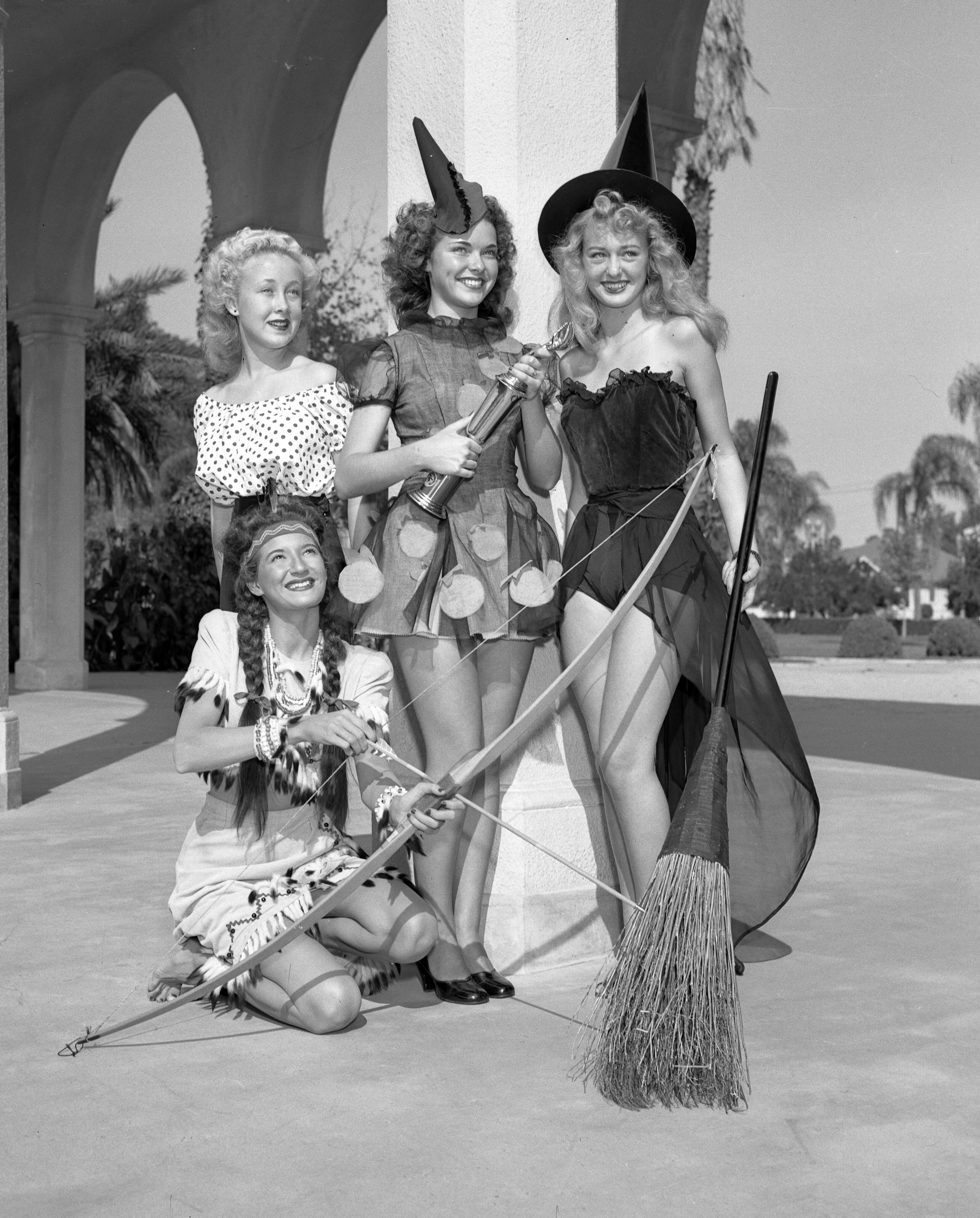
Four contestants in the Halloween Slick Chick beauty contest in Anaheim, California, 1947

Many theme parks stage Halloween events annually, such as Halloween Horror Nights at Universal Studios Hollywood and Universal Orlando, Mickey's Halloween Party and Mickey's Not-So-Scary Halloween Party at Disneyland Resort and Magic Kingdom respectively, and Knott's Scary Farm at Knott's Berry Farm. One of the more notable parades is New York's Village Halloween Parade. Each year approximately 50,000 costumed marchers parade up Sixth Avenue. Salem, Massachusetts, site of the Salem witch trials, celebrates Halloween throughout the month of October with tours, plays, concerts, and other activities. A number of venues in New York's lower Hudson Valley host various events to showcase a connection with Washington Irving's Legend of Sleepy Hollow. Van Cortlandt Manor stages the "Great Jack o' Lantern Blaze" featuring thousands of lighted carved pumpkins.

Some locales have had to modify their celebrations due to disruptive behavior on the part of young adults. Madison, Wisconsin hosts an annual Halloween celebration. In 2002, due to the large crowds in the State Street area, a riot broke out, necessitating the use of mounted police and tear gas to disperse the crowds. Likewise, Chapel Hill, site of the University of North Carolina, has a downtown street party which in 2007 drew a crowd estimated at 80,000 on downtown Franklin Street, in a town with a population of just 54,000. In 2008, in an effort to curb the influx of out-of-towners, mayor Kevin Foy put measures in place to make commuting downtown more difficult on Halloween. In 2014, large crowds of college students rioted at the Keene, New Hampshire Pumpkin Fest, whereupon the City Council voted not to grant a permit for the following year's festival, and organizers moved the event to Laconia for 2015.

=== Brazil ===
The Brazilian non-governmental organization named Amigos do Saci created Saci Day as a Brazilian parallel in opposition to the "American-influenced" holiday of Halloween that saw minor celebration in Brazil. The Saci is a mischievous evil character in Brazilian folklore. Saci Day is commemorated on October 31, the same day as Halloween, and is an official holiday in the state of São Paulo. Despite official recognition in São Paulo and several other municipalities throughout the country, few Brazilians celebrate it.

=== Dominican Republic ===
In the Dominican Republic it has been gaining popularity, largely due to many Dominicans living in the United States and then bringing the custom to the island. In the larger cities of Santiago or Santo Domingo it has become more common to see children trick-or-treating, but in smaller towns and villages it is almost entirely absent, partly due to religious opposition. Tourist areas such as Sosua and Punta Cana feature many venues with Halloween celebrations, predominantly geared towards adults.

=== Mexico (Día de Muertos) ===
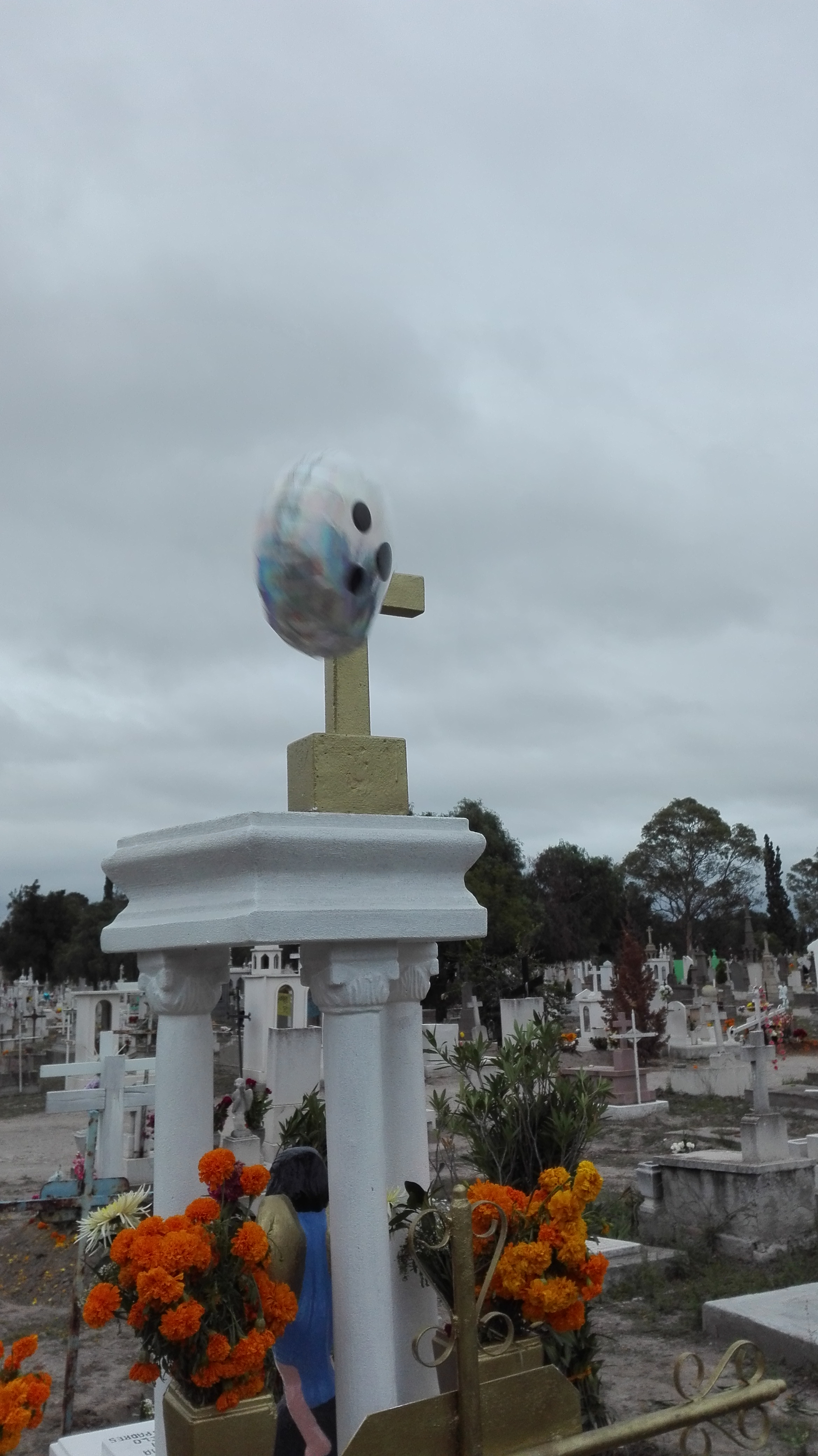
Mexican tomb on the Day of the Dead, adorned with the cempasúchil, the holiday's traditional flower, and a Halloween ghost balloon, at the historic cemetery of San Luis Potosí City

Observed in Mexico and Mexican communities abroad, Day of the Dead (Spanish: Día de Muertos) celebrations arose from the syncretism of indigenous Aztec traditions with the Christian Hallowtide of the Spanish colonizers. Flower decorations, altars and candies are part of this holiday season. The holiday is distinct from Halloween in its origins and observances, but the two have become associated because of cross-border connections between Mexico and the United States through popular culture and migration, as the two celebrations occur at the same time of year and may involve similar imagery, such as skeletons. Halloween and Día de Muertos have influenced each other in some areas of the United States and Mexico, with Halloween traditions such as costumes and face-painting becoming increasingly common features of the Mexican festival.

== Asia ==
=== China ===
The Chinese celebrate the "Hungry Ghost Festival" in mid-July, when it is customary to float river lanterns to remember those who have died. By contrast, Halloween is often called "All Saints' Festival" (Wànshèngjié, 萬聖節), or (less commonly) "All Saints' Eve" (Wànshèngyè, 萬聖夜) or "Eve of All Saints' Day" (Wànshèngjié Qiányè, 萬聖節前夕), stemming from the term "All Hallows Eve" (hallow referring to the souls of holy saints). Chinese Christian churches hold religious celebrations. Non-religious celebrations are dominated by expatriate Americans or Canadians, but costume parties are also popular for Chinese young adults, especially in large cities. Hong Kong Disneyland and Ocean Park (Halloween Bash) host annual Halloween shows.

Mainland China has been less influenced by Anglo traditions than Hong Kong and Halloween is generally considered "foreign". As Halloween has become more popular globally it has also become more popular in China, however, particularly amongst children attending private or international schools with many foreign teachers from North America.

==== Hong Kong ====
Traditional "door-to-door" trick or treating is not commonly practiced in Hong Kong due to the vast majority of Hong Kong residents living in high-rise apartment blocks. However, in many buildings catering to expatriates, Halloween parties and limited trick or treating is arranged by the management. Instances of street-level trick or treating in Hong Kong occur in ultra-exclusive gated housing communities such as The Beverly Hills populated by Hong Kong's super-rich and in expatriate areas like Discovery Bay and the Red Hill Peninsula. For the general public, there are events at Tsim Sha Tsui's Avenue of the Stars that try to mimic the celebration. In the Lan Kwai Fong area of Hong Kong, known as a major entertainment district for the international community, a Halloween celebration and parade has taken place for over 20 years, with many people dressing in costume and making their way around the streets to various drinking establishments. Many international schools also celebrate Halloween with costumes, and some put an academic twist on the celebrations such as the "Book-o-ween" celebrations at Hong Kong International School where students dress as favorite literary characters.

=== Japan ===
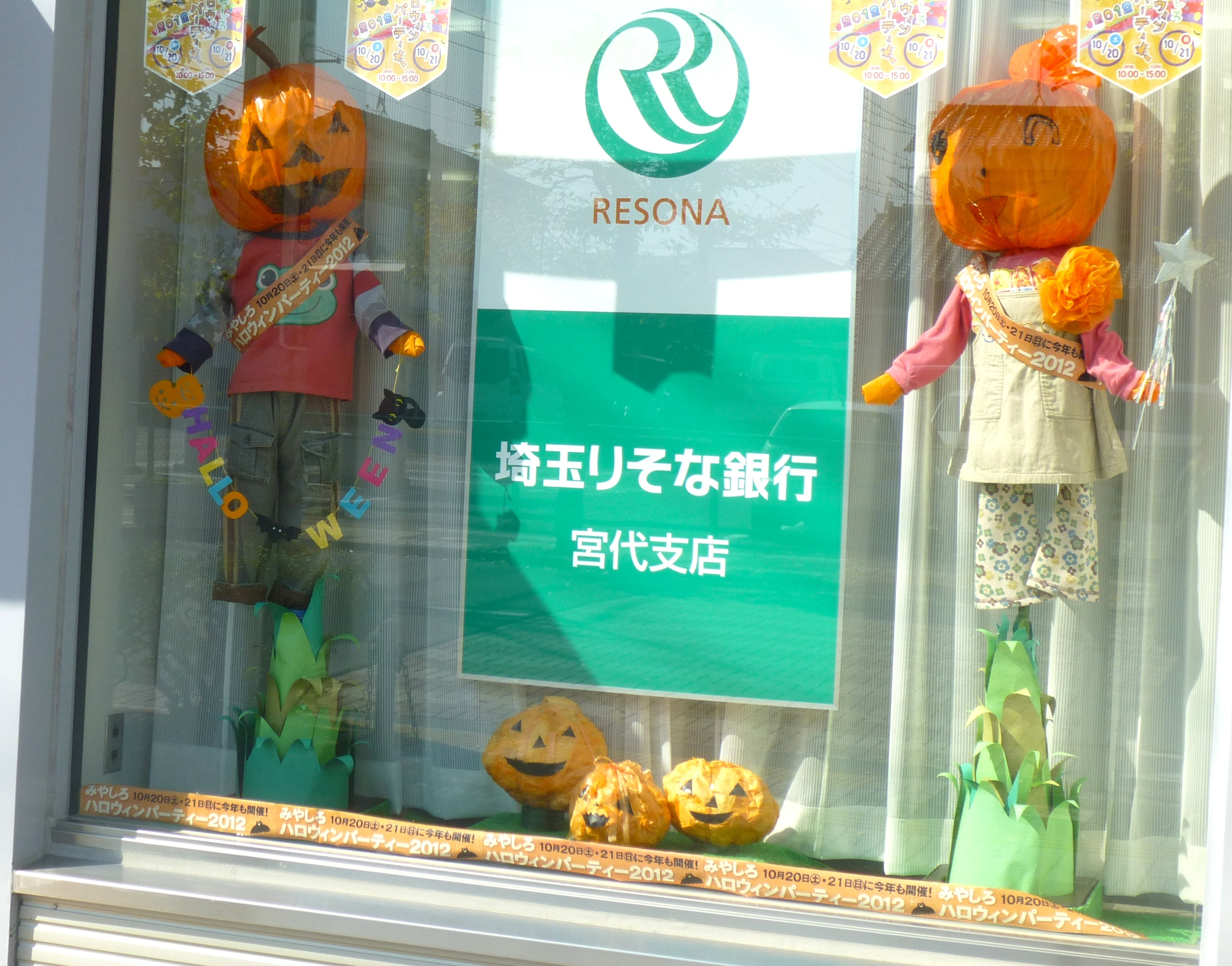
A Halloween display in a local bank window, in Saitama, Japan

Halloween arrived in Japan mainly as a result of American pop culture. As late as 2009, it was celebrated mainly by expats. The wearing of elaborate costumes by young adults at night has since become popular in areas such as Amerikamura in Osaka and Shibuya in Tokyo, where, in October 2012, about 1700 people dressed in costumes to take part in the Halloween Festival. Celebrations have become popular with young adults as a costume party and club event. Trick-or-treating for Japanese children has taken hold in some areas. By the mid-2010s, Yakuza were giving snacks and sweets to children. However in recent years authorities in Tokyo have tried to discourage street drinking on Halloween.

=== Philippines ===
The period from 31 October through 2 November is a time for remembering dead family members and friends. Many Filipinos travel back to their hometowns for family gatherings of festive remembrance.

Trick-or-treating is gradually replacing the dying tradition of Pangangaluluwâ, a local analogue of the old English custom of souling. People in the provinces still observe Pangangaluluwâ by going in groups to every house and offering a song in exchange for money or food. The participants, usually children, would sing carols about the souls in Purgatory, with the abúloy (alms for the dead) used to pay for Masses for these souls. Along with the requested alms, householders sometimes gave the children suman (rice cakes). During the night, various small items, such as clothing, plants, etc., would "mysteriously" disappear, only to be discovered the next morning in the yard or in the middle of the street. In older times, it was believed that the spirits of ancestors and loved ones visited the living on this night, manifesting their presence by taking an item.

As the observation of Christmas traditions in the Philippines begins as early as September, it is a common sight to see Halloween decorations next to Christmas decorations in urban settings.

=== Saudi Arabia ===
Starting 2022, Saudi Arabia began to celebrate Halloween in the public in Riyadh under its Vision 2030.

=== Singapore ===
Around mid-July Singapore Chinese celebrate "Zhong Yuan Jie / Yu Lan Jie" (Hungry Ghosts Festival), a time when it is believed that the spirits of the dead come back to visit their families. In recent years, Halloween celebrations are becoming more popular, with influence from the west. In 2012, there were over 19 major Halloween celebration events around Singapore. SCAPE's Museum of Horrors held its fourth scare fest in 2014. Universal Studios Singapore hosts "Halloween Horror Nights".

=== South Korea ===
The popularity of the holiday among young people in South Korea comes from English academies and corporate marketing strategies, and was influenced by Halloween celebrations in Japan and America. Despite not being a public holiday, it is celebrated in different areas around Seoul, especially Itaewon and Hongdae.

=== Taiwan ===
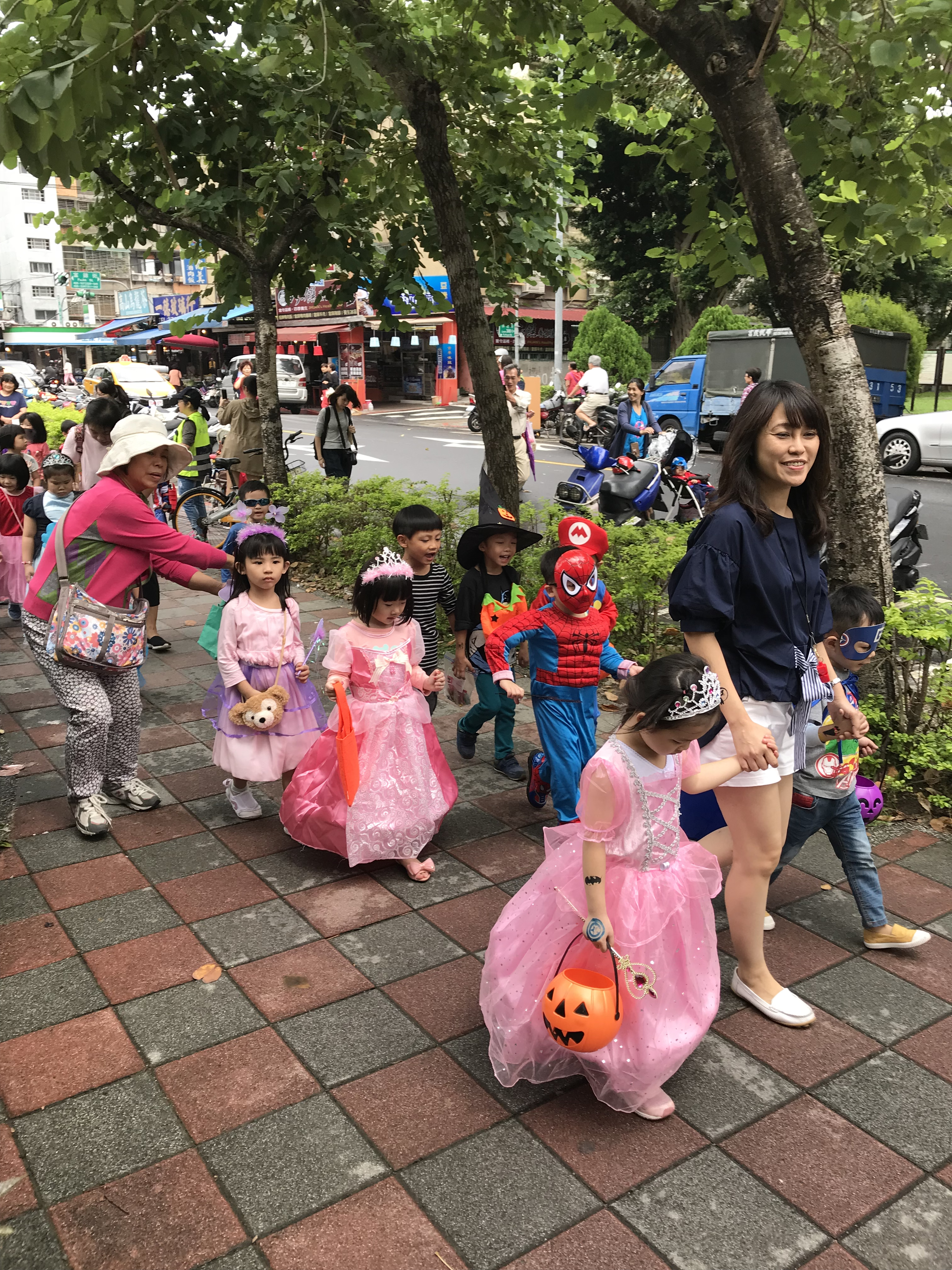
Children dressed up in Halloween costume in Songshan District, Taipei, Taiwan

Traditionally, Taiwanese people celebrate "Zhong Yuan Pudu Festival", where spirits that do not have any surviving family members to pay respects to them, are able to roam the Earth during the seventh lunar month. It is known as Ghost Month. While some have compared it to Halloween, it has no relations and the overall meaning is different. In recent years, mainly as a result of American pop culture, Halloween is becoming more widespread amongst young Taiwanese people. Halloween events are held in many areas across Taipei, such as Xinyi Special District and Shilin District where there are many international schools and expats. Halloween parties are celebrated differently based on different age groups. One of the most popular Halloween event is the Tianmu Halloween Festival, which started in 2009 and is organised by the Taipei City Office of Commerce. The 2-day annual festivity has attracted more than 240,000 visitors in 2019. During this festival, stores and businesses in Tianmu place pumpkin lanterns outside their stores to identify themselves as trick-or-treat destinations for children.

=== Turkey ===
In the Turkish city of Konya, there is a tradition called "Şivlilik" where children go to houses to get candy or chocolate, which is the closest Turkish tradition to halloween.

== Oceania ==
=== Australia ===
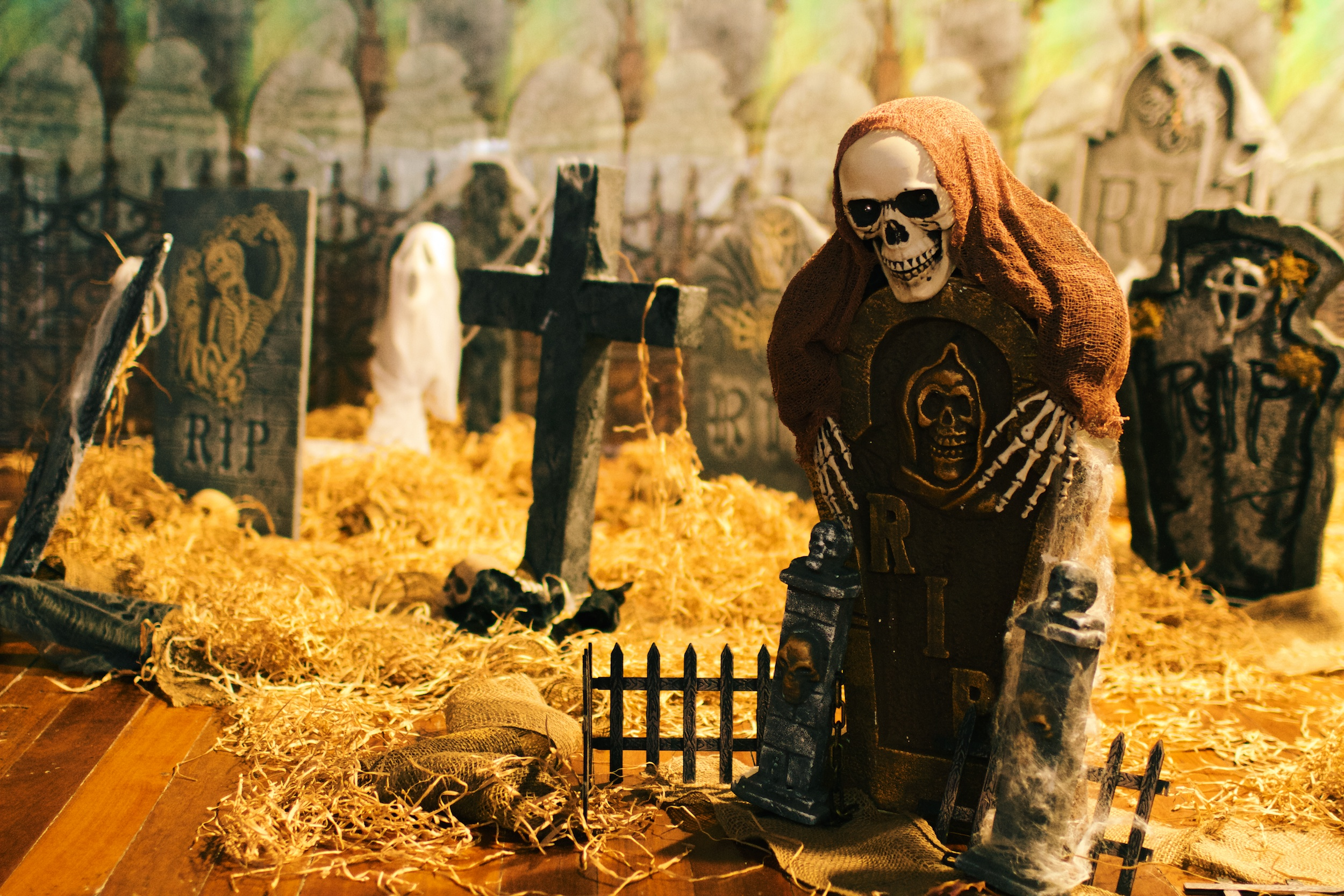
Halloween display in Sydney, Australia

Non-religious celebrations of Halloween modelled on North American festivities are growing increasingly popular in Australia despite not being traditionally part of the culture. Some Australians criticise this intrusion into their culture. Many dislike the commercialisation and American pop-culture influence. Some supporters of the event place it alongside other cultural traditions such as Saint Patrick's Day.

Halloween historian and author of Halloween: Pagan Festival to Trick or Treat, Mark Oxbrow says while Halloween may have been popularised by depictions of it in US movies and TV shows, it is not a new entry into Australian culture. His research shows Halloween was first celebrated in Australia in Castlemaine, Victoria, in 1858, which was 43 years before Federation. His research shows Halloween traditions were brought to the country by Scottish miners who settled in Victoria during the Gold Rush.

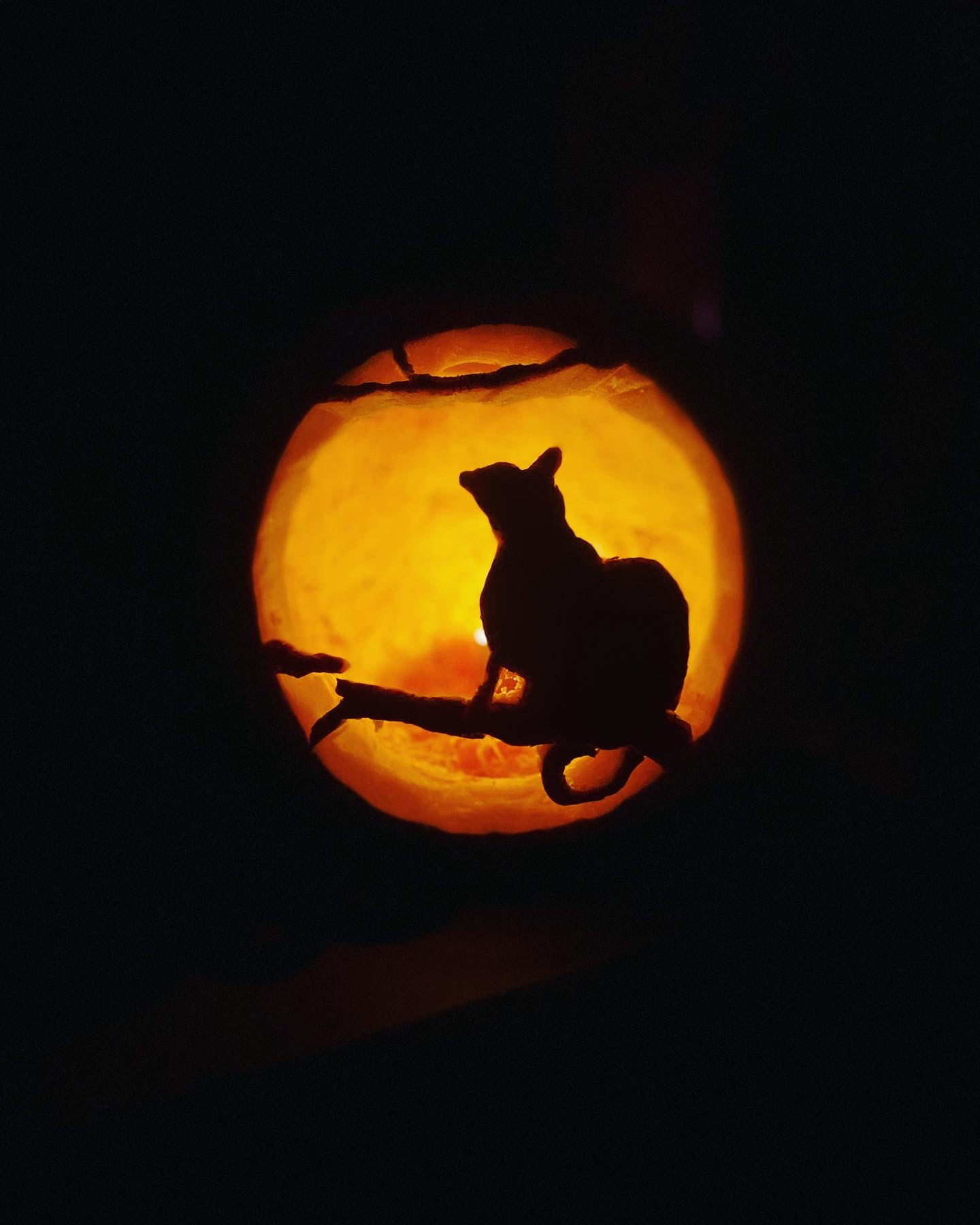
Jack-o'-lantern in Adelaide, South Australia

Because of the polarised opinions about Halloween, growing numbers of people are decorating their letter boxes to indicate that children are welcome to come knocking. In the past decade, the popularity of Halloween in Australia has grown. In 2020, the first magazine dedicated solely to celebrating Halloween in Australia was launched, called Hallozween, and in 2021, sales of costumes, decorations and carving pumpkins soared to an all-time high despite the effect of the global COVID-19 pandemic limiting celebrations.

=== New Zealand ===
Halloween first gained traction in New Zealand in the 1990s, and every year it is one of the first countries in the world to celebrate Halloween due to its proximity to the International Date Line. Although Halloween is not celebrated to the same extent as in North America, it is still a significant event, mainly celebrated in urban areas. Trick-or-treat has become increasingly popular with minors in New Zealand, despite being not a "British or Kiwi event" and the influence of American globalisation. One criticism of Halloween in New Zealand is that it is overly commercialised—by The Warehouse, for example.

== Europe ==
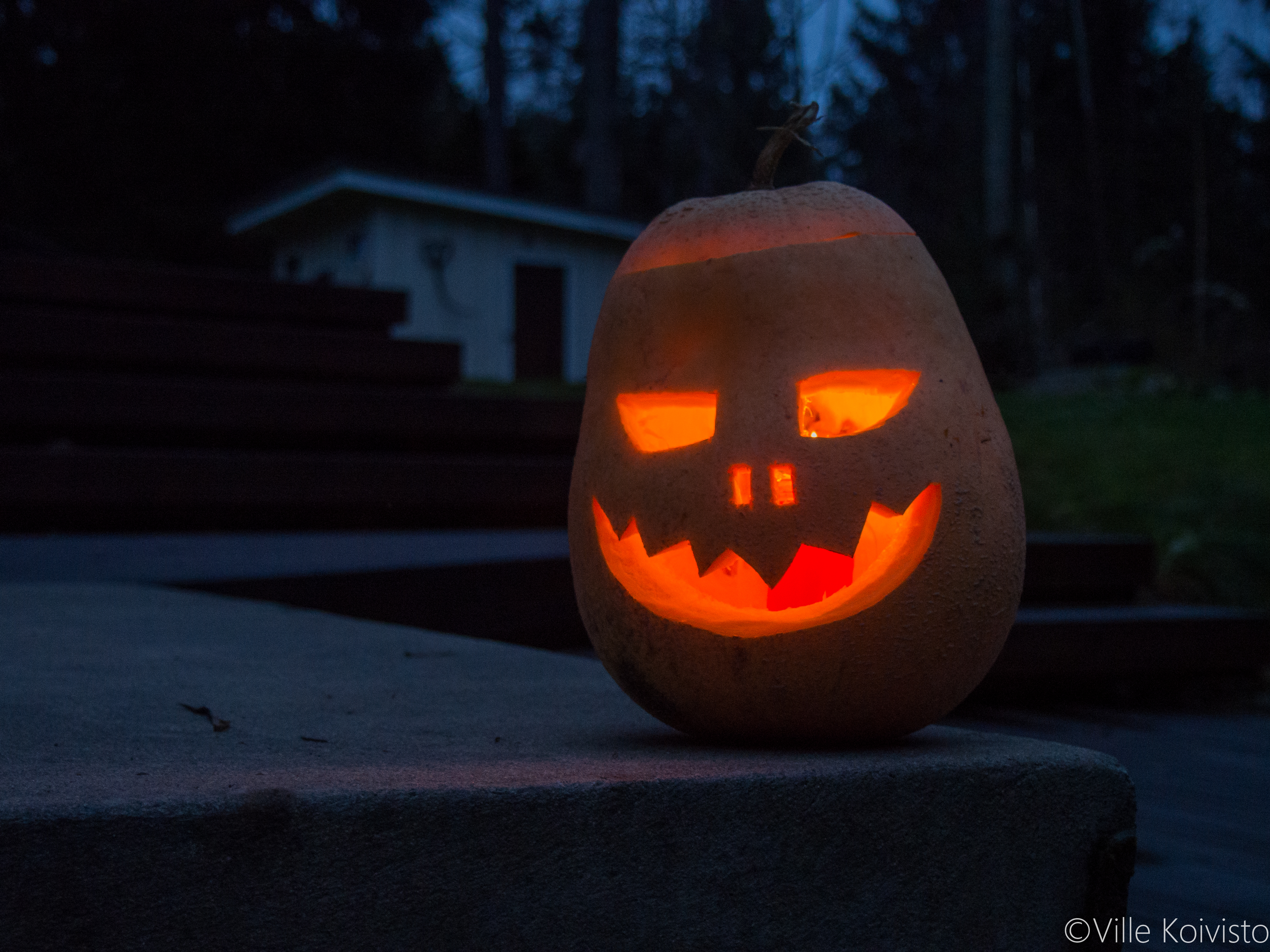
A jack-o'-lantern in Finland

Over the years, Halloween has become more popular in Europe and has been partially ousting some older customs like the Rübengeistern (English: turnip ghosts, beet spirit), Martinisingen, and others.

=== France ===
Halloween was introduced to most of France in the 1990s. In Brittany, Halloween had been celebrated for centuries and is known as Kalan Goañv (Night of Spirits). During this time, it is believed that the spirits of the dead return to the world of the living led by the Ankou, the collector of souls.

=== Germany ===
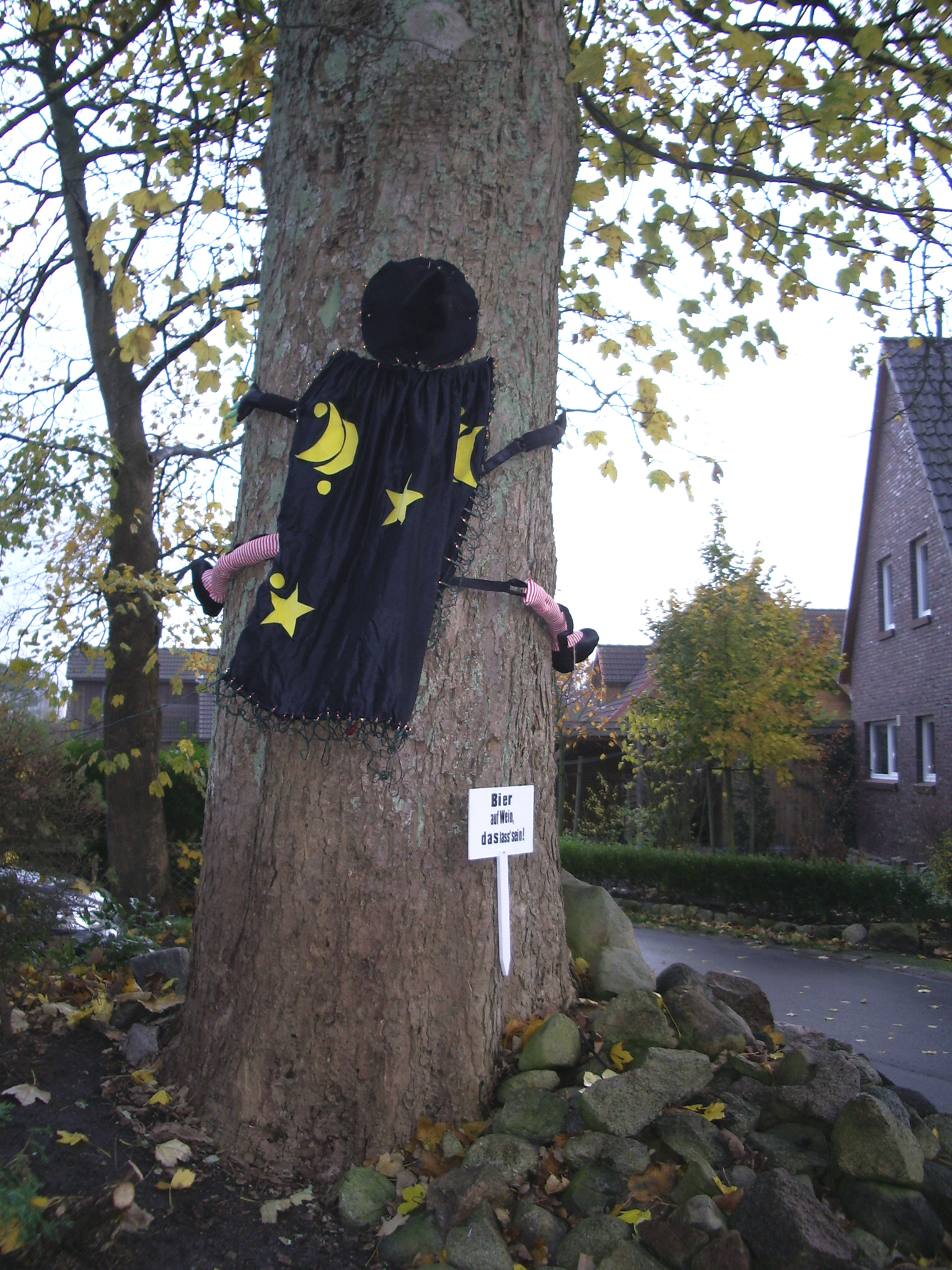
"Don't drink and fly" Halloween decoration in Germany

Halloween was not generally observed in Germany prior to the 1990s, but has been increasing in popularity. It has been associated with the influence of United States culture, and "Trick or Treating" (German: Süßes sonst gibt's Saures) has been occurring in various German cities, especially in areas such as the Dahlem neighborhood in Berlin, which was part of the American zone during the Cold War. Today, Halloween in Germany brings in 200 million euros a year, through multiple industries. Halloween is celebrated by both children and adults. Adults celebrate at themed costume parties and clubs, while children go trick or treating. Complaints of vandalism associated with Halloween "Tricks" are increasing, particularly from many elderly Germans unfamiliar with "Trick or Treating".

=== Greece ===
In Greece, Halloween is not celebrated widely and it is a working day, with little public interest, since the early 2000s. Recently, it has somewhat increased in popularity as both a secular celebration; although Carnival is vastly more popular among Greeks. For very few, Halloween is considered the fourth most popular festival in the country after Christmas, Easter, and Carnival. Retail businesses, bars, nightclubs, and certain theme parks might organize Halloween parties. This boost in popularity has been attributed to the influence of western consumerism.

Since it is a working day, Halloween is not celebrated on 31 October unless the date falls on a weekend, in which case it is celebrated by some during the last weekend before All Hallow's Eve, usually in the form of themed house parties and retail business decorations. Trick-or-treating is not widely popular because similar activities are already undertaken during Carnival. The slight rise in popularity of Halloween in Greece has led to some increase in its popularity throughout nearby countries in the Balkans and Cyprus. In the latter, there has been an increase in Greek-Cypriot retailers selling Halloween merchandise every year.

=== Ireland ===
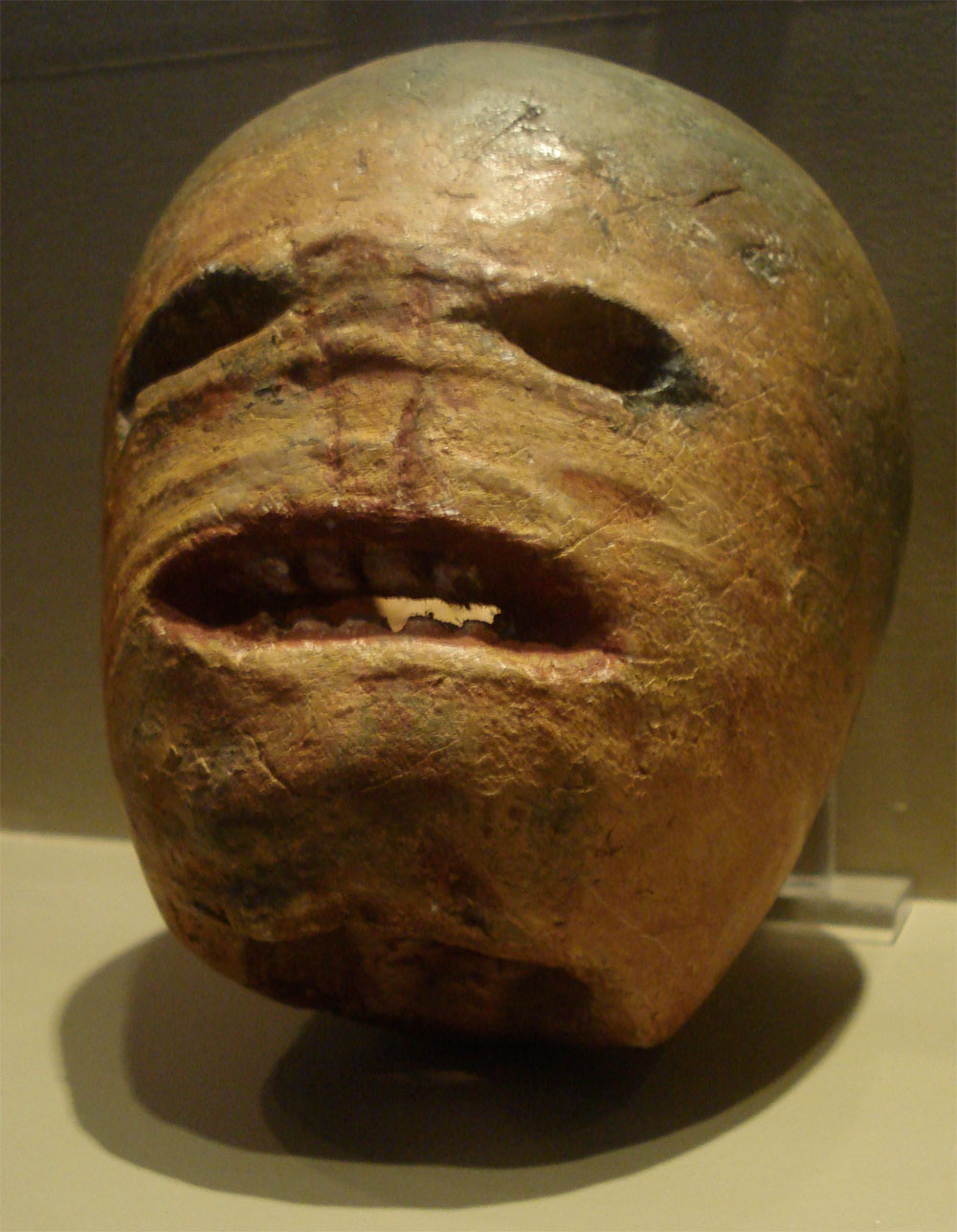
A plaster cast of a traditional Irish Halloween turnip (rutabaga) lantern on display in the Museum of Country Life, Ireland

On Halloween night, adults and children dress up as various monsters and creatures, light bonfires, and enjoy fireworks displays; Derry in Northern Ireland is home to the largest organized Halloween celebration on the island, in the form of a street carnival and fireworks display.

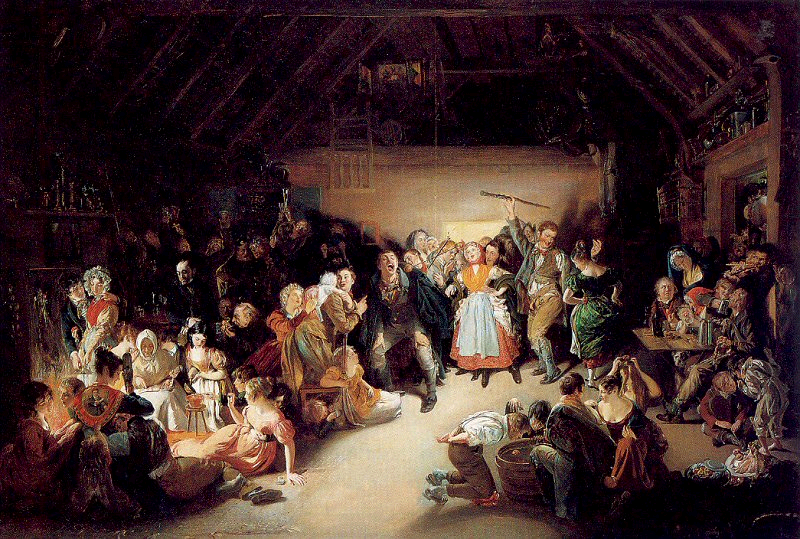
Snap-Apple Night, painted by Daniel Maclise in 1833, depicts apple bobbing and divination games at a Halloween party in Ireland

Games are often played, such as bobbing for apples, in which apples, peanuts, other nuts and fruits, and some small coins are placed in a basin of water. Everyone takes turns catching as many items possible using only their mouths. Another common game involves the hands-free eating of an apple hung on a string attached to the ceiling. Games of divination are also played at Halloween. Colcannon is traditionally served on Halloween.

31 October is the busiest day of the year for the Emergency Services. Bangers and fireworks are illegal in the Republic of Ireland; however, they are commonly smuggled in from Northern Ireland where they are legal. Bonfires are frequently built around Halloween. Trick-or-treating is popular amongst children on 31 October and Halloween parties and events are commonplace.

October Holiday occurs on the last Monday of October and may fall on Halloween. Its Irish names are Lá Saoire i Mí Dheireadh Fómhair or Lá Saoire Oíche Shamhna, the latter translating literally as 'Halloween holiday'.

=== Italy ===
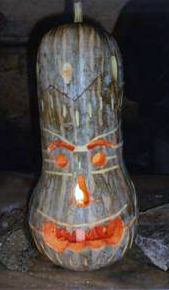
A carved pumpkin in Sardinia

In Italy, All Saints' Day is a public holiday. On 2 November, Tutti i Morti or All Souls' Day, families remember loved ones who have died. These are still the main holidays. In some Italian tradition, children would awake on the morning of All Saints or All Souls to find small gifts from their deceased ancestors. In Sardinia, Concas de Mortu (Head of the deads), carved pumpkins that look like skulls, with candles inside are displayed. Halloween is, however, gaining in popularity, and involves costume parties for young adults. The traditions to carve pumpkins in a skull figure, lighting candles inside, or to beg for small gifts for the deads e.g. sweets or nuts, also belong to North Italy. In Veneto these carved pumpkins were called lumère (lanterns) or suche dei morti (deads' pumpkins).

=== Poland ===
Since the fall of Communism in 1989, Halloween has become increasingly popular in Poland. Particularly, it is celebrated among younger people. The influx of Western tourists and expats throughout the 1990s introduced the costume party aspect of Hallowe'en celebrations, particularly in clubs and at private house parties. Door-to-door trick or treating is not common. Pumpkin carving is becoming more evident, following a strong North American version of the tradition. Poland is the biggest pumpkin producer in the European Union.

=== Romania ===
Romanians observe the Feast of St. Andrew, patron saint of Romania, on 30 November. On St. Andrew's Eve ghosts are said to be about. A number of customs related to divination, in other places connected to Halloween, are associated with this night. However, with the popularity of Dracula and vampires in western Europe, around Halloween the Romanian tourist industry promotes trips to locations connected to the historical Vlad Tepeș and the more fanciful Dracula of Bram Stoker. One of the most successful Halloween Parties in Transylvania takes place in Sighișoara, the citadel where Vlad the Impaler was born. This party include magician shows, ballet show and The Ritual Killing of a Living Dead The biggest Halloween party in Transylvania take place at Bran Castle, aka Dracula's Castle from Transylvania.

Both the Catholic and Orthodox Churches in Romania discourage Halloween celebrations, advising their parishioners to focus rather on the "Day of the Dead" on 1 November, when special religious observances are held for the souls of the deceased. Opposition by religious and nationalist groups, including calls to ban costumes and decorations in schools in 2015, have been met with criticism. Halloween parties are popular in bars and nightclubs.

=== Russia ===
In Russia, most Christians are Orthodox, and in the Orthodox Church, Halloween is on the Saturday after Pentecost, and therefore 4 to 5 months before western Halloween. Celebration of western Halloween began in the 1990s around the downfall of the Soviet regime, when costume and ghoulish parties spread in night clubs throughout Russia. Halloween is generally celebrated by younger generations and is not widely celebrated in civic society (e.g. theaters or libraries). In fact, Halloween is among the Western celebrations that the Russian government and politicians—which have grown increasingly anti-Western in the early 2010s—are trying to eliminate from public celebration.

=== Spain ===
In Catalonia, celebrations involve eating castanyes (roasted chestnuts), panellets (special almond balls covered in pine nuts), moniatos (roast or baked sweet potato), Ossos de Sant cake and preserved fruit (candied or glazed fruit). Moscatell (Muscat) is drunk from porrons. Around the time of this celebration, it was common before Climate Change for street vendors to sell hot toasted chestnuts wrapped in newspaper. In many places, confectioners often organised raffles of chestnuts and preserved fruit.

The tradition of eating these foods comes from the fact that during All Saints' night, on the eve of All Souls' Day in the Christian tradition, bell ringers would ring bells in commemoration of the dead into the early morning. Friends and relatives would help with this task, and everyone would eat these foods for sustenance and warming.

Other versions of the story state that the Castanyada originates at the end of the 18th century and comes from the old funeral meals, where other foods, such as vegetables and dried fruit were not served. The meal had the symbolic significance of a communion with the souls of the departed: while the chestnuts were roasting, prayers would be said for the person who had just died.

The festival is usually depicted with the figure of a castanyera: an old lady, dressed in peasant's clothing and wearing a headscarf, sitting behind a table, roasting chestnuts for street sale.

In recent years, the Castanyada has become a revetlla of All Saints and is celebrated in the home and community. It is the first of the four main school festivals, alongside Christmas, Carnestoltes and St George's Day, without reference to ritual or commemoration of the dead.

Galicia is known to have the second largest Halloween or Samain festivals in Europe and during this time, a drink called Queimada is often served.

=== Sweden ===
On All Hallow's Eve, a Requiem Mass is widely attended every year at Uppsala Cathedral, part of the Lutheran Church of Sweden.

Throughout the period of Allhallowtide, starting with All Hallow's Eve, Swedish families visit churchyards and adorn the graves of their family members with lit candles and wreaths fashioned from pine branches.

Among children, the practice of dressing in costume and collecting candy gained popularity beginning around 2005. The American traditions of Halloween have however been met with skepticism among the older generations, in part due to conflicting with the Swedish traditions on All Hallow's Eve and in part due to their commercialism. In Sweden, All Saints' Day/ All Hallow's Eve is observed on the Saturday occurring between October 31 and November 6, whereas Halloween is observed on October 31, every year.

=== Switzerland ===
In Switzerland, Halloween, after first becoming popular in 1999, is on the wane, and is most popular with young adults who attend parties. Switzerland already has a "festival overload" and even though Swiss people like to dress up for any occasion, they do prefer a traditional element, such as in the Fasnacht tradition of chasing away winter using noise and masks.

=== United Kingdom and Crown dependencies ===
==== England ====
In the past, on All Souls' Eve families would stay up late, and little "soul cakes" were eaten. At the stroke of midnight, there was solemn silence among households, which had candles burning in every room to guide the souls back to visit their earthly homes and a glass of wine on the table to refresh them. The tradition of giving soul cakes that originated in Great Britain and Ireland was known as souling, often seen as the origin of modern trick or treating in North America, and souling continued in parts of England as late as the 1930s, with children going from door to door singing songs and saying prayers for the dead in return for cakes or money.

Trick or treating and other Halloween celebrations are extremely popular, with shops decorated with witches and pumpkins, and young people attending costume parties.

==== Scotland ====
The name Halloween is first attested in the 16th century as a Scottish shortening of the fuller All-Hallow-Even, that is, the night before All Hallows' Day. Dumfries poet John Mayne's 1780 poem made note of pranks at Halloween "What fearfu' pranks ensue!". Scottish poet Robert Burns was influenced by Mayne's composition, and portrayed some of the customs in his poem Halloween (1785). According to Burns, Halloween is "thought to be a night when witches, devils, and other mischief-making beings are all abroad on their baneful midnight errands".

Among the earliest record of Guising at Halloween in Scotland is in 1895, where masqueraders in disguise carrying lanterns made out of scooped out turnips, visit homes to be rewarded with cakes, fruit and money. If children approached the door of a house, they were given offerings of food. The children's practice of "guising", going from door to door in costumes for food or coins, is a traditional Halloween custom in Scotland. These days children who knock on their neighbours doors have to sing a song or tell stories for a gift of sweets or money.

A traditional Halloween game includes apple "dooking", or "dunking" or (i.e., retrieving one from a bucket of water using only one's mouth), and attempting to eat, while blindfolded, a treacle/jam-coated scone hanging on a piece of string.

Traditional customs and lore include divination practices, ways of trying to predict the future. A traditional Scottish form of divining one's future spouse is to carve an apple in one long strip, then toss the peel over one's shoulder. The peel is believed to land in the shape of the first letter of the future spouse's name.

In Kilmarnock, Halloween is also celebrated on the last Friday of October, and is known colloquially as "Killieween".

==== Isle of Man ====
Halloween is a popular traditional occasion on the Isle of Man, where it is known as Hop-tu-Naa.

== Elsewhere ==
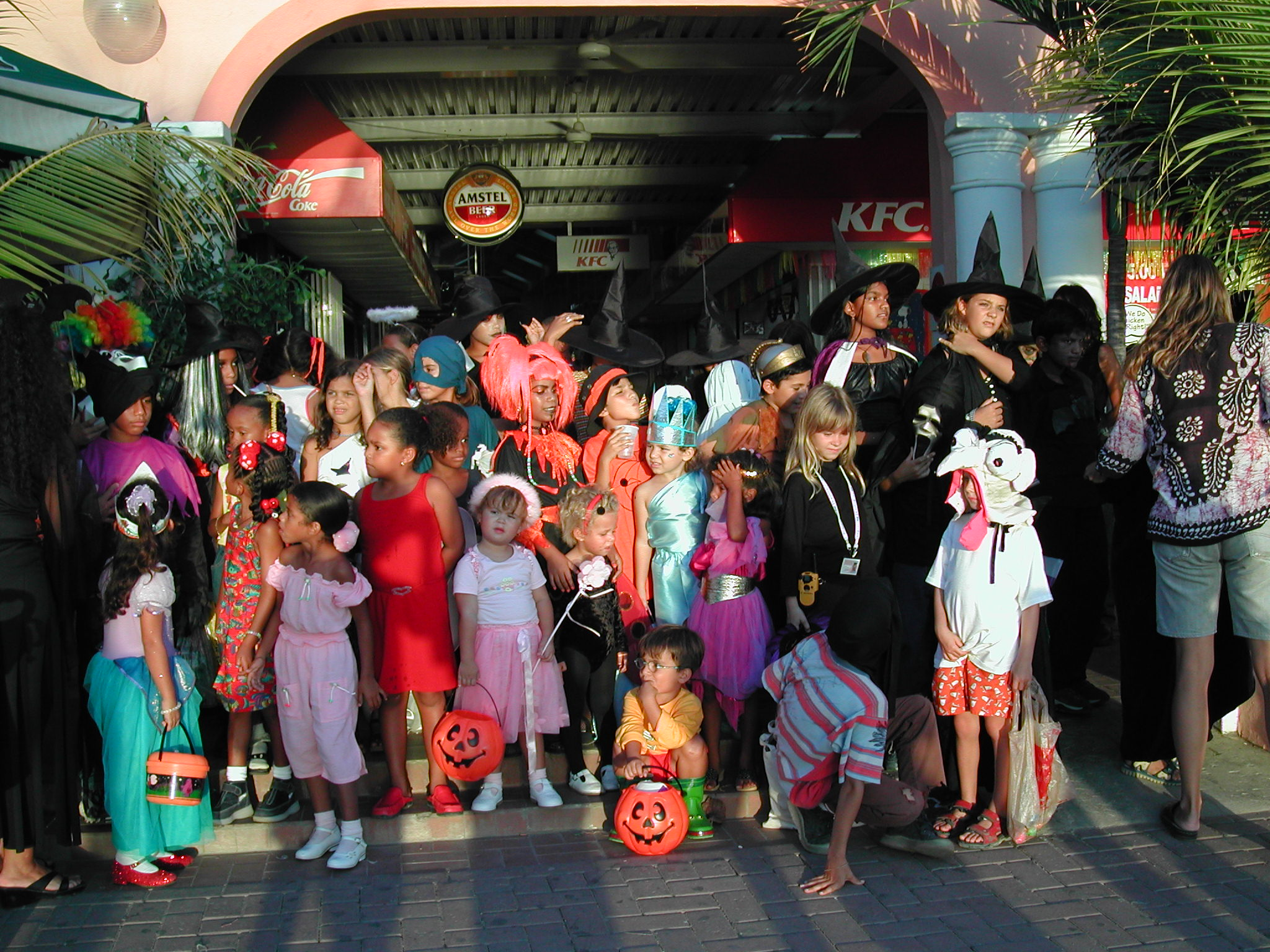
The children of the largest town in Bonaire gather together on Halloween day.

=== Saint Helena ===
In Saint Helena, Halloween is actively celebrated much along the American model, featuring ghosts, devils, witches and the like. Imitation pumpkins are used instead of real ones, as the pumpkin harvesting season in Saint Helena's hemisphere is not near Halloween. Trick-or-treating is widespread, and party venues provide entertainment for adults.

== See also ==
- Festival of the Dead
- Games and other activities during Halloween
