= Ruddiman =

Ruddiman is a surname. Notable people with the surname include:

- Thomas Ruddiman (1674–1757), Scottish classical scholar
- Walter Ruddiman (1719–1781), Scottish printer, publisher, and newspaper proprietor
- William Ruddiman, American paleoclimatologist
