= Benjamin Phelps Gibbon =

Benjamin Phelps Gibbon (1802–1851) was a Welsh line-engraver. He concentrated on animal and portrait engravings, carried out for publishers.

== Life ==
He was the son of the Rev. Benjamin Gibbon, vicar of Penally, Pembrokeshire, who died in 1813. He was educated at the Clergy Orphan School, and then was articled to Edward Scriven, the chalk-engraver. Although he was interested in acting, when he had worked his articles he went to work under the line-engraver John Henry Robinson. He worked with his younger brother, Henry Cousins (1809-1864), on numerous projects.

Gibbon died at home in the cholera pandemic at Albany Street, Regent's Park, London, on 28 July 1851, in his forty-ninth year. He was unmarried.

== Works ==
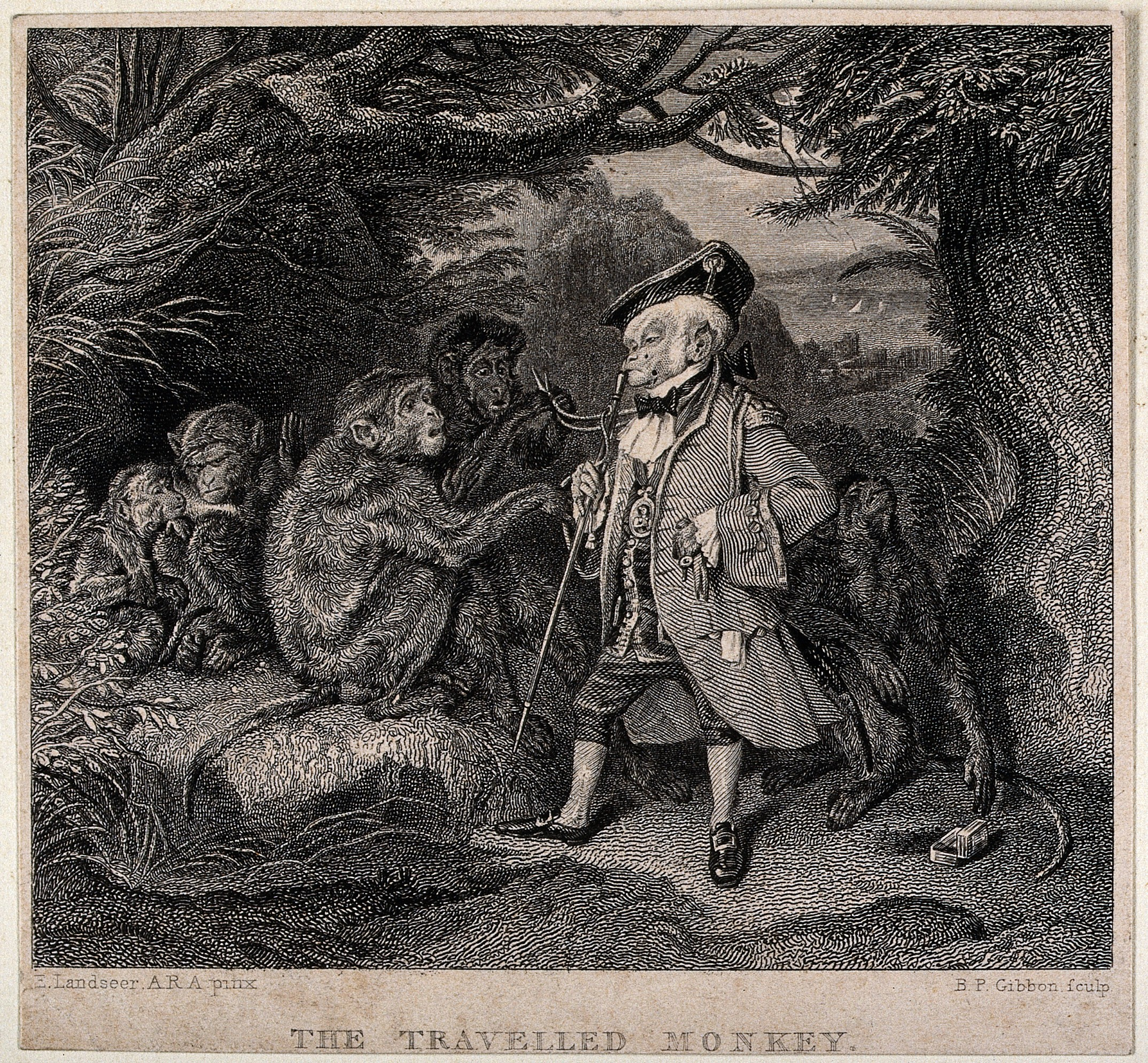
The Travelled Monkey, 1828, Benjamin Phelps Gibbon after Edwin Landseer

Gibbon's plates drew largely from the works of Sir Edwin Landseer, after whom he engraved:

- The Twa Dogs, 1827;
- The Travelled Monkey, 1828, a small plate engraved for The Anniversary;
- The Fireside Party, 1831;
- Jack in Office, 1834;
- Suspense, 1837;
- The Shepherd's Grave, 1838;
- The Shepherd's Chief Mourner, 1838;
- Be it ever so humble, there's no place like Home, 1843;
- The Highland Shepherd's Home, 1846; and
- Roebuck and Rough Hounds, 1849.

He engraved also Wolves attacking Deer, 1834, after Friedrich Gauermann, with the landscape engraved by Edward Webb; and The Wolf and the Lamb, after William Mulready.

Gibbon's portraits include a half-length portrait of Queen Victoria, after William Fowler (1796–1880), engraved in 1840; and a head of his master, Edward Scriven, after Andrew Morton, engraved for John Pye's Patronage of British Art, 1845. He left unfinished a plate from Thomas Webster's picture of The Boy with many Friends, which was completed by P. Lightfoot.

== Notes ==
Attribution

This article incorporates text from a publication now in the public domain: Stephen, Leslie, ed. (1890). "Gibbon, Benjamin Phelps". Dictionary of National Biography. Vol. 21. London: Smith, Elder & Co.
