= John Masey Wright =

British painter (1777–1866)

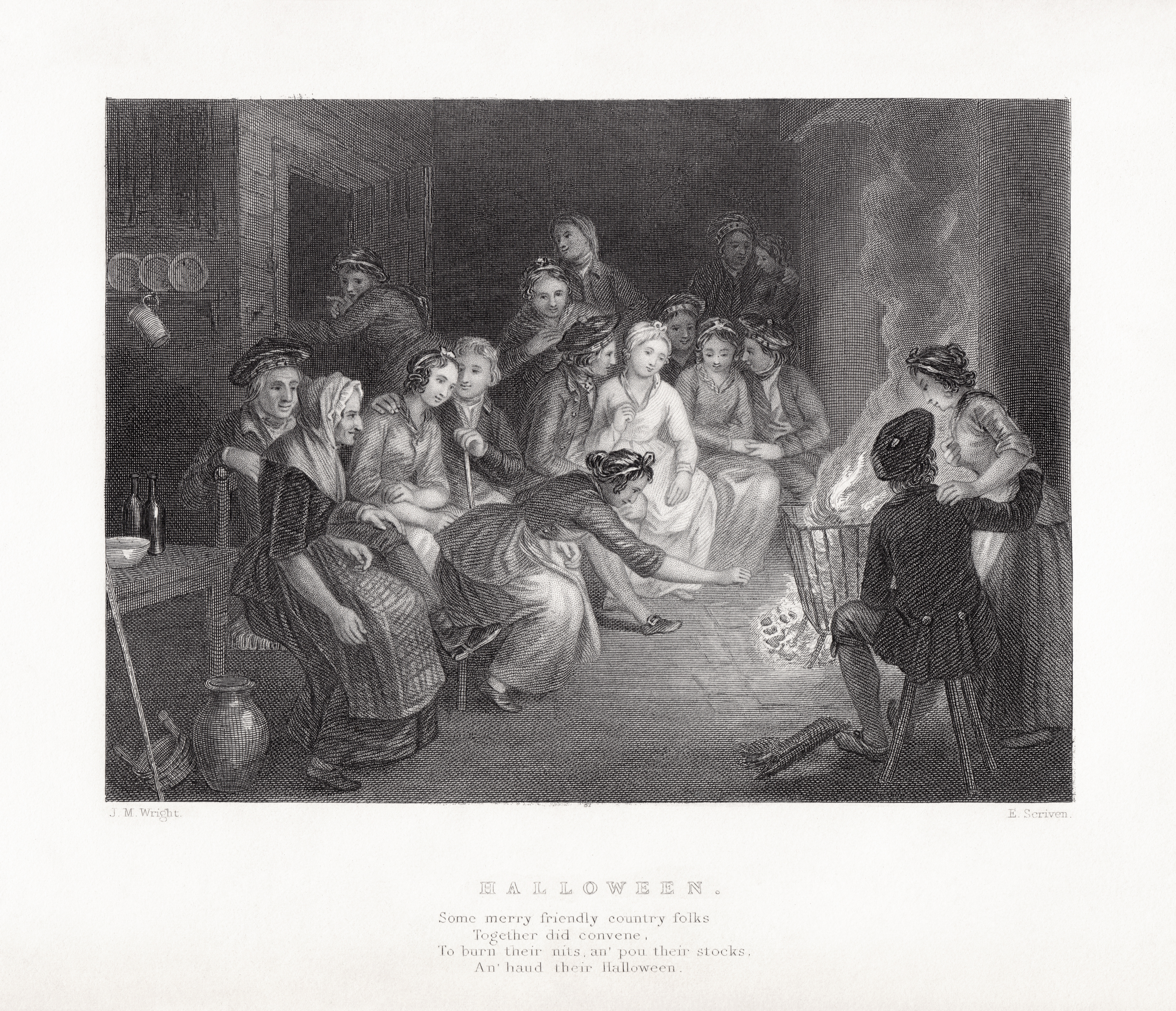
Edward Scriven's engraving of John Masey Wright's illustration to Robert Burns' "Halloween"

John Masey Wright (1777–1866) was a British watercolourist. He was the son of an organ-builder and was apprenticed to the same business, but, as it proved distasteful to him, he was allowed to follow his natural inclination for art. As a boy he was given the opportunity of watching Thomas Stothard when at work in his studio, but otherwise he was self-taught. About 1810 Wright became associated with Henry Aston Barker, for whose panorama in the Strand he did much excellent work, including the battles of Coruña, Vittoria, and Waterloo.

He was also employed for a time as a scene-painter at the opera-house. But his reputation rests upon his small compositions illustrating Shakespeare and other poets, which were extremely numerous and executed with admirable taste and feeling in the manner of Stothard. He exhibited at the Royal Academy from 1812 to 1818, and in 1824 was elected an associate of the Watercolour Society; he became a full member in 1825, and thenceforward to the end of his long life was a regular exhibitor. His drawings were largely engraved for the ‘Literary Souvenir,’ ‘Amulet,’ ‘Forget-me-not,’ and similar publications; also for fine editions of the works of Sir Walter Scott and Burns, and for the ‘Gallery of Modern British Artists.’ Plates from his Battle of Vitoria’ and ‘The Ghost, a Christmas Frolic,’ appeared in 1814, and ‘Devotion,’ a subject from Boccaccio, was engraved by Charles Heath in 1833. Though extremely industrious, Wright was poorly remunerated for his work, and during his later years received a small pension from the Watercolour Society.

== Personal life ==
Wright was born on Tuesday 14 Oct. 1777 at Pentonville, London, where his father was an organ-builder. He died on Sunday 13 May 1866. He married a Miss Meadows and with her had a son and a daughter.

== Gallery ==
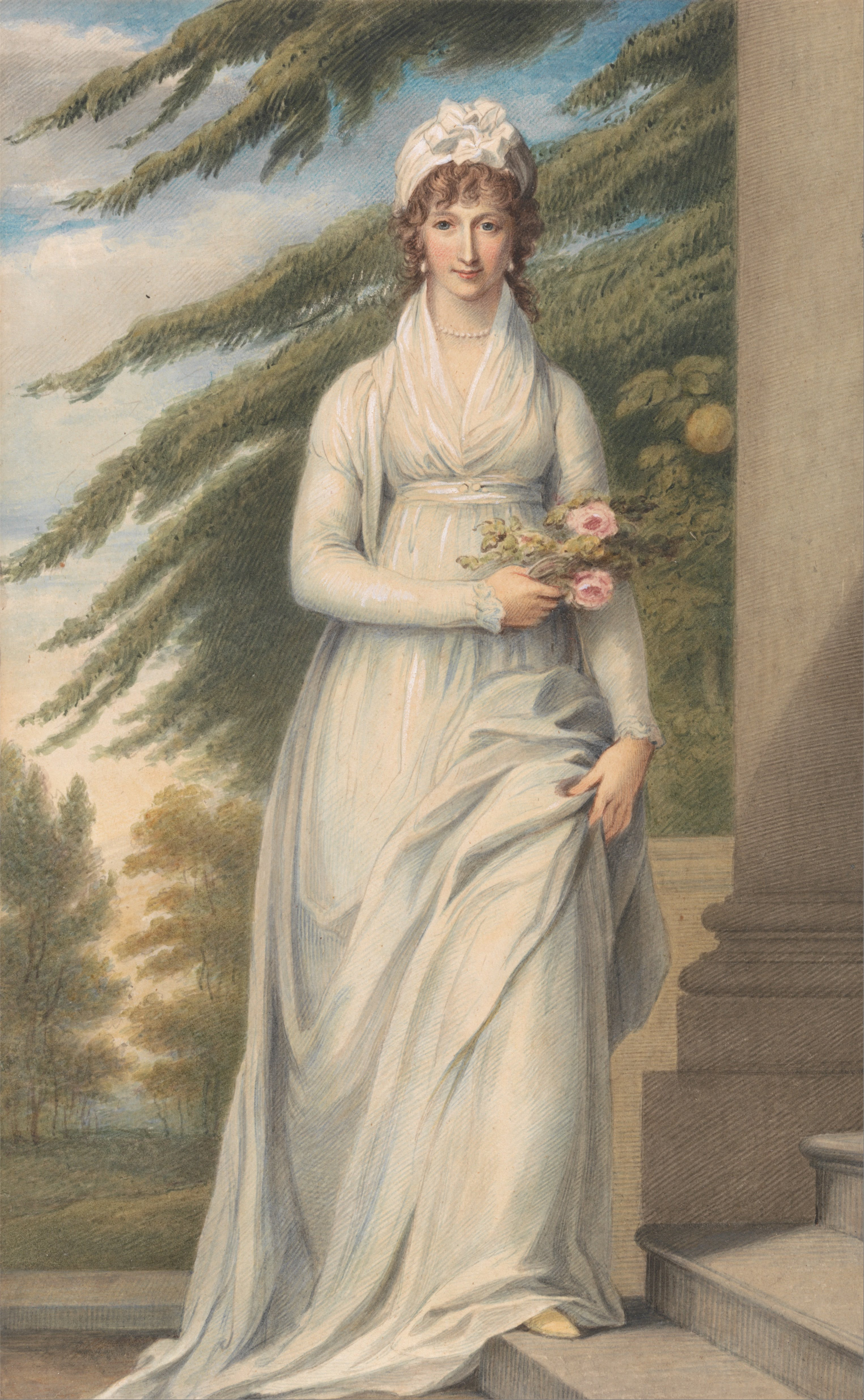
Mrs. Martha Udney, 1801

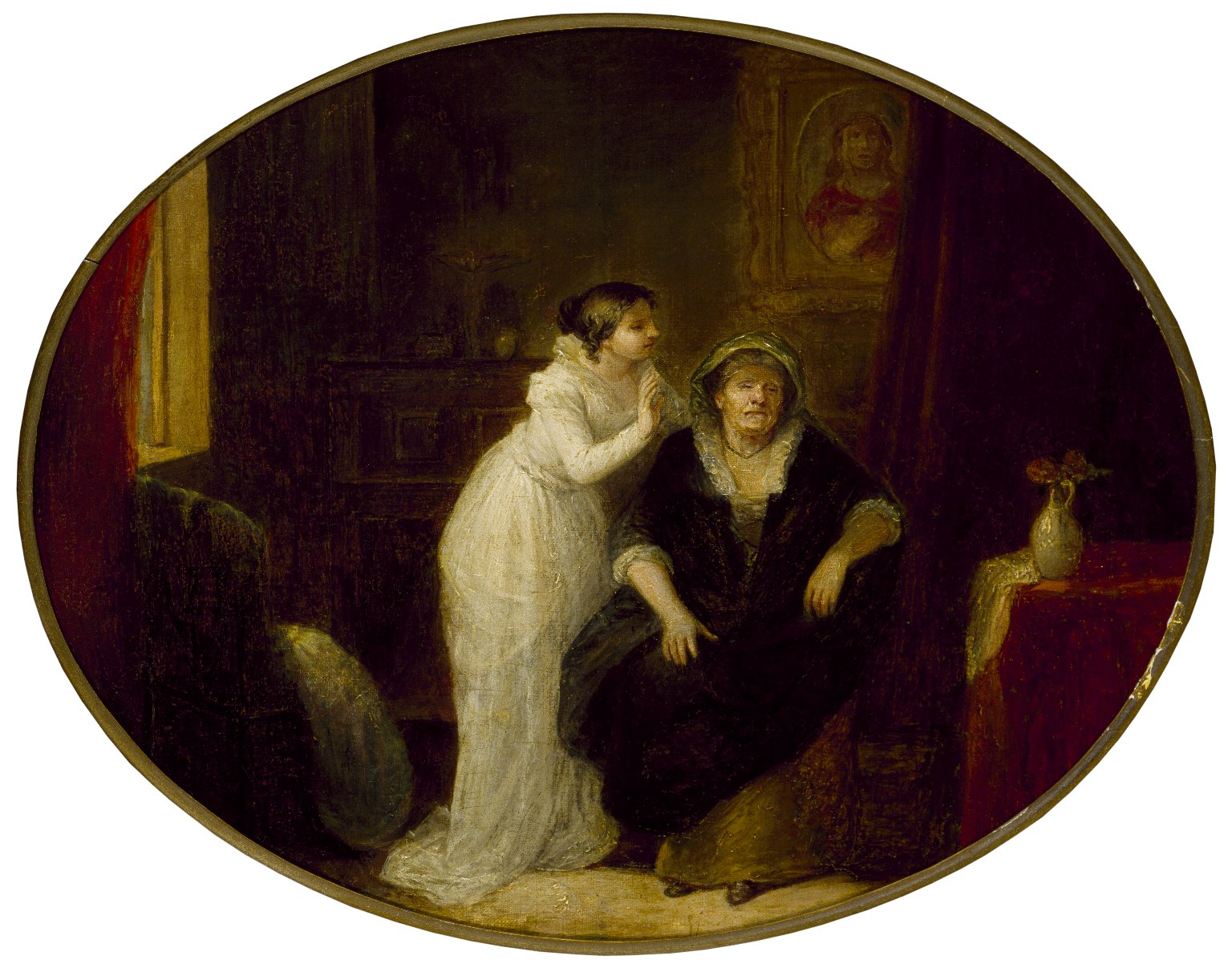
Juliet and the Nurse, c. 1810s

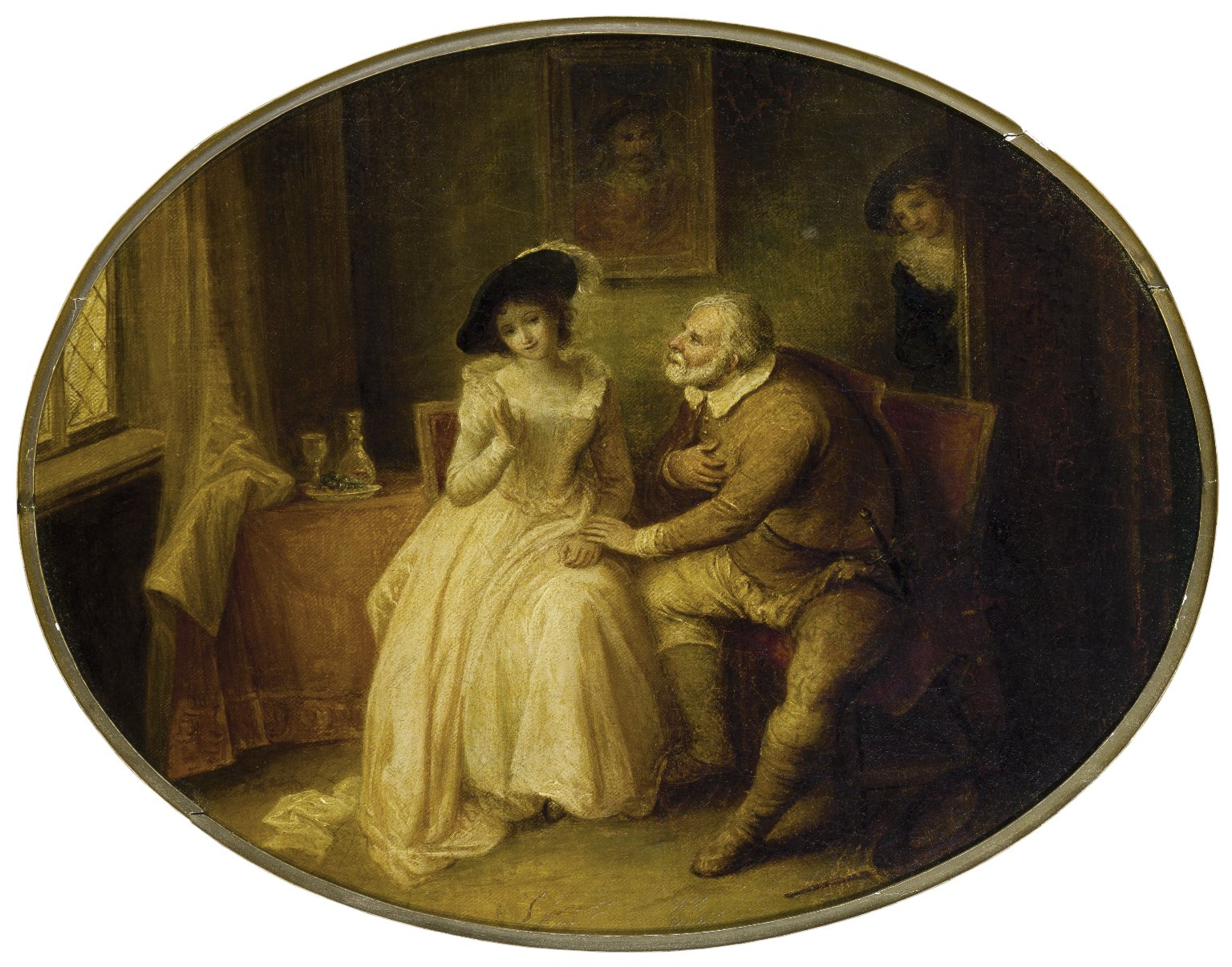
Mistress Ford and Falstaff, c. 1810s

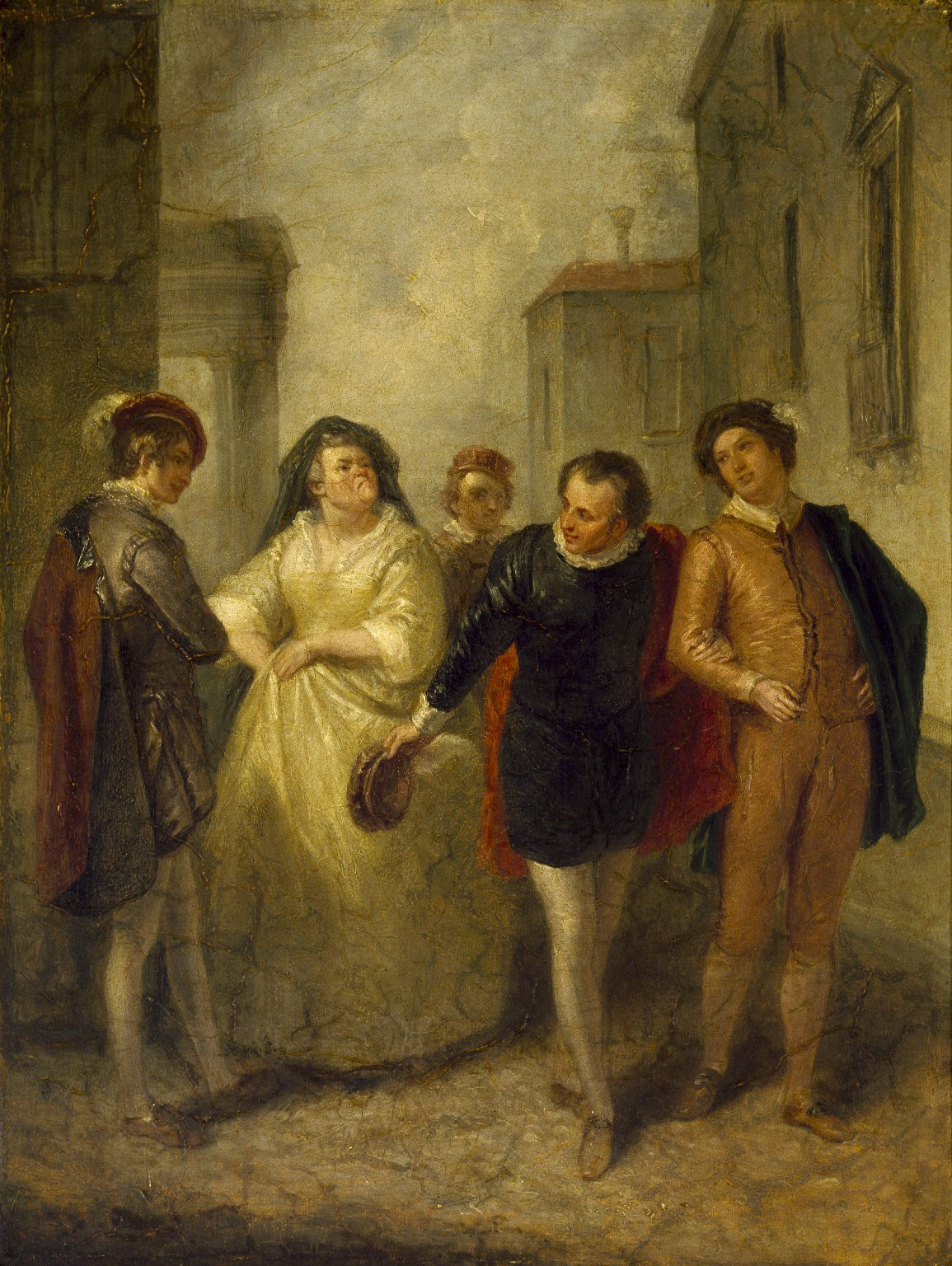
Mercutio bidding farewell to Juliet's nurse, c. 1820s
