= Edward Scriven =

English engraver

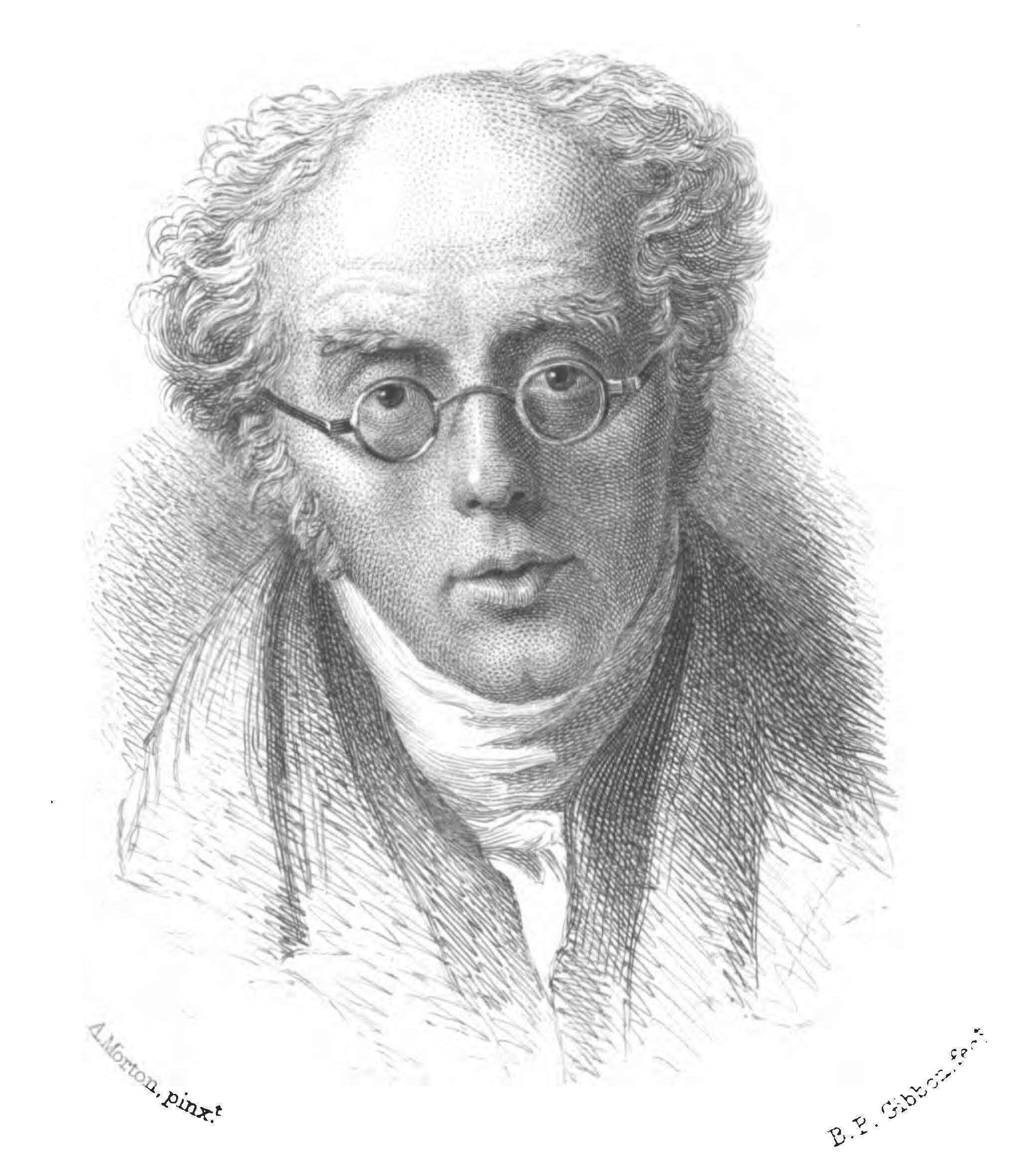
1845 engraving by Benjamin Phelps Gibbon after a portrait by Andrew Morton

Edward Scriven (1775 – 23 August 1841) was an English engraver of portraits, in the stipple and chalk manner. Scriven was the pre-eminent engraver of his generation, with 210 portraits ascribed to him by the National Portrait Gallery.

== Life ==
Scriven was born in 1775 at Alcester, Warwickshire, though his name does not appear in the parish register. He was for eight years a pupil of Northall (Northaw), Hertfordshire engraver Robert Thew. When Thew died in 1802, Scriven replaced him as Historical Engraver to the Prince of Wales. On the Prince of Wales' succession to the throne in 1820 as George IV Scriven was appointed Historical Engraver to the King.

Early in his career he came to London to work on plates for the London publisher, John Boydell. Scriven became the eminent engraver of his generation, producing over 200 portrait engravings.

He was considered to be a man of great active benevolence among the members of his profession and a leading proponent and founder of the Artists' Annuity Fund in 1810.

He died on 23 August 1841 at his home at 46 Clarendon Square, Somers Town, London, leaving a widow and five children. He was buried in Kensal Green Cemetery, where a stone was erected to his memory by the members of the Artists' Fund. The monument was designed and created by Charles Harriott Smith.

Benjamin Phelps Gibbon and Robert William Sievier studied engraving under Scriven.

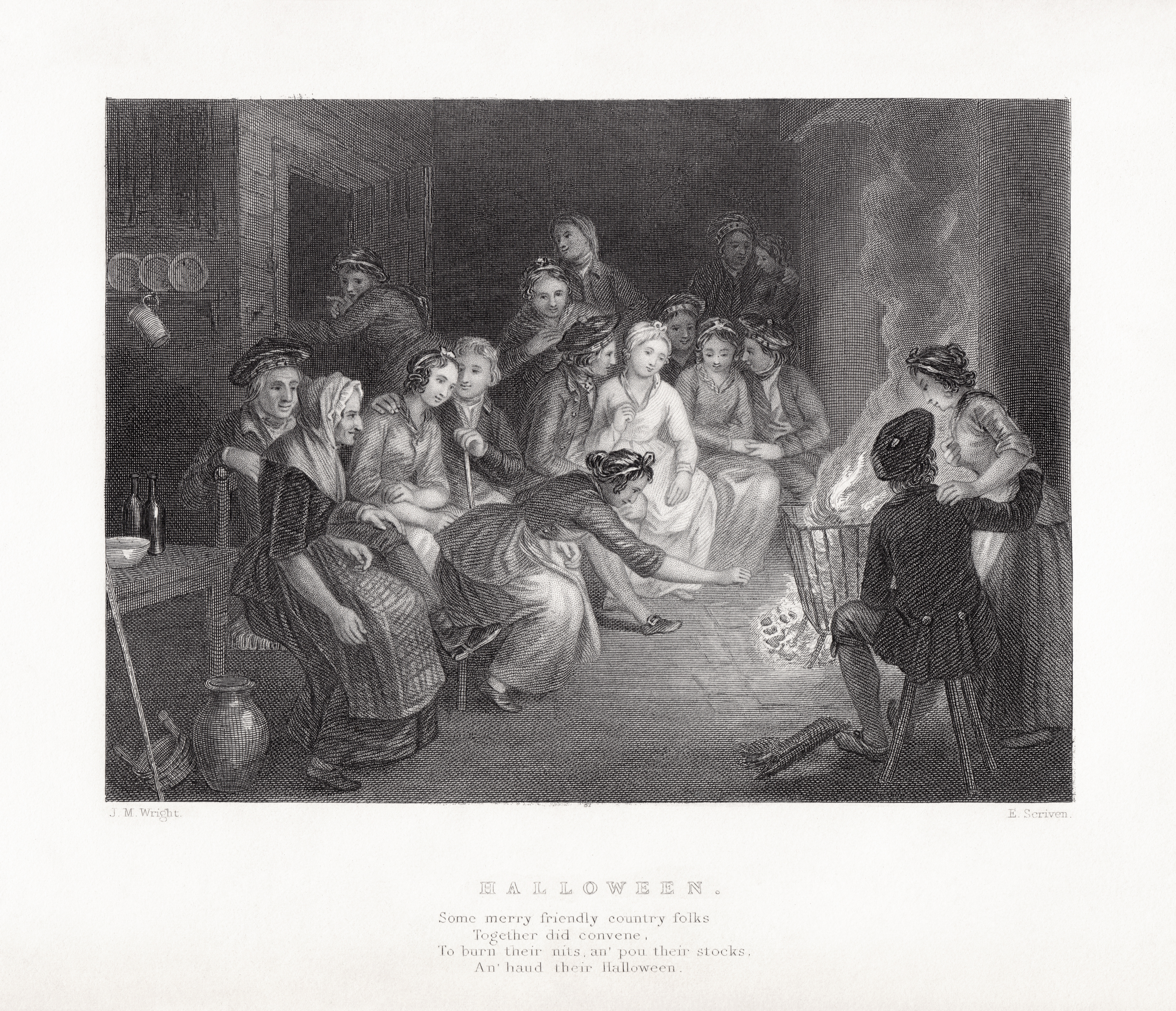
Edward Scriven's engraving of John Masey Wright's illustration to Robert Burns' Halloween

== Works ==
Scriven worked mainly for the publishers of expensively illustrated books and serials, such as the British Gallery of Portraits, (1809–17); Ancient Marbles in the British Museum (1814); Henry Tresham and William Young Ottley's British Gallery, 1828; Edmund Lodge's Portraits of Illustrious Persons, 1821–34; Thomas Frognall Dibdin's Ædes Althorpianæ, 1822; William Jerdan's National Portrait Gallery, 1830–4; and Anna Jameson's Beauties of the Court of Charles II, 1833. His few individual plates included:

- Telemachus and Mentor discovered by Calypso, after Richard Westall, 1810;
- A portrait of Rev. Rowland Broomhead, after Joseph Allen, 1813;
- A portrait of Thomas Clifford, 1st Baron Clifford of Chudleigh, after Samuel Cooper, 1819;
- Miranda, after William Hilton, 1828; and
- A portrait of Edward Daniel Clarke, after John Opie, 1828.

He also engraved a set of Benjamin West's studies of heads for his picture of Christ Rejected.

A portrait of Scriven, painted by Andrew Morton, was engraved by Benjamin Phelps Gibbon as an illustration to John Pye's Patronage of British Art.
