= Halloween (poem) =

1785 poem by Robert Burns

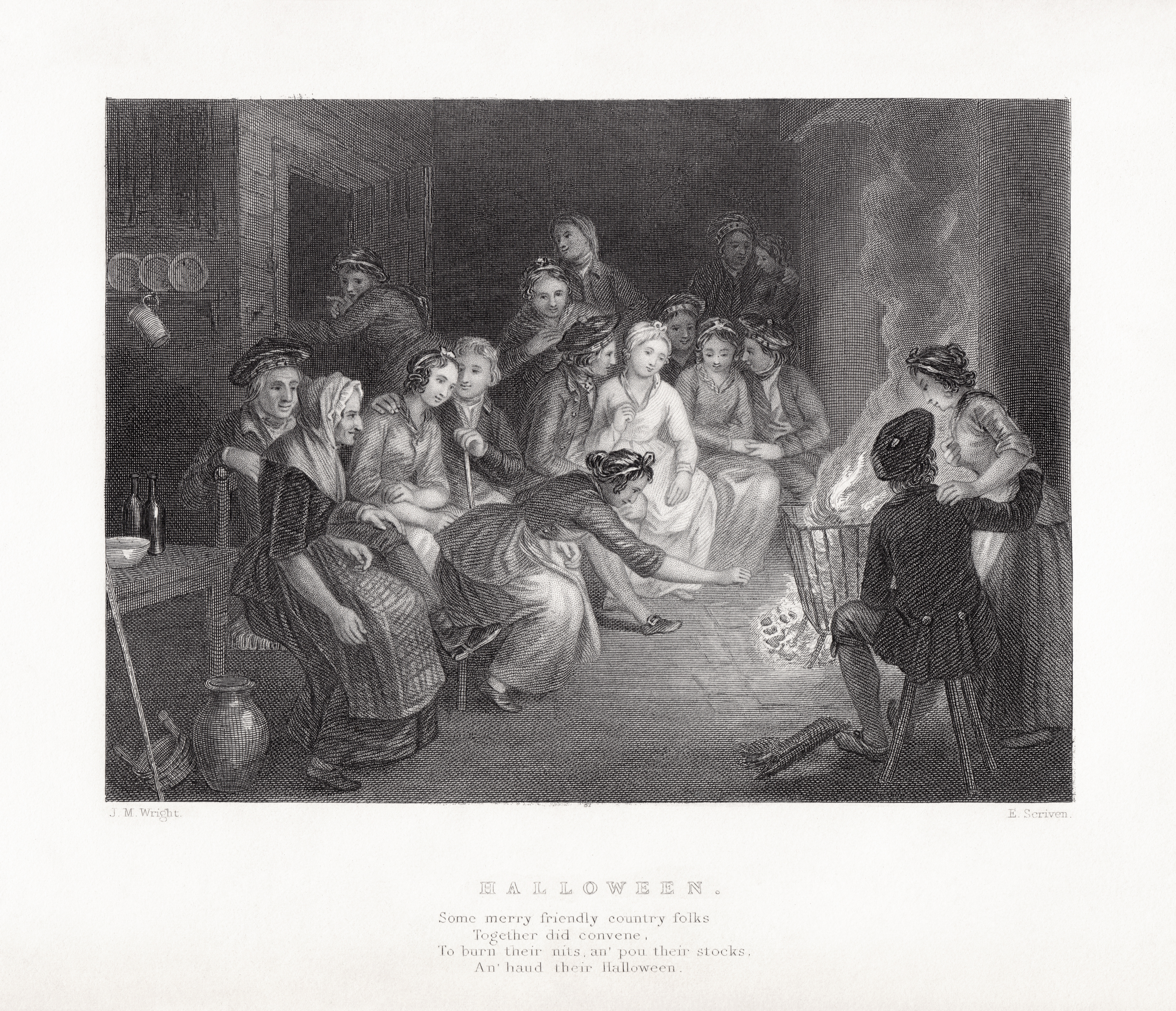
Edward Scriven's engraving of John Masey Wright's illustration to Robert Burns' Halloween

Halloween (Note: "Is thought to be a night when witches, devils, and other mischief-making beings are abroad on their baneful midnight errands; particularly those aerial people, the fairies, are said on that night to hold a grand anniversary." — Burns)

Upon that night, when fairies light
On Cassilis Downans (Note: "Certain little, romantic, rocky, green hills, in the neighbourhood of the ancient seat of the Earls of Cassilis." — Burns) dance,
Or owre the lays, in splendid blaze,
On sprightly coursers prance;
Or for Colean the rout is ta'en,
Beneath the moon's pale beams;
There, up the Cove, (Note: "A noted cavern near Colean house, called the Cove of Colean; which, as well as Cassilis Downans, is famed, in country story, for being a favorite haunt of fairies." — Burns) to stray an' rove,
Amang the rocks and streams
To sport that night;

[...]

— Robert Burns

"Halloween" is a poem written by the Scottish poet Robert Burns in 1785. First published in 1786, the poem is included in the Kilmarnock Edition. It is one of Burns' longer poems, with twenty-eight stanzas, and employs a mixture of Scots and English.

== Background ==
The poet John Mayne from Dumfries, "a comparatively obscure follower of the Scottish Muses", wrote a poem about Halloween in 1780. Having twelve stanzas, the poem makes note of pranks at Halloween: "What fearfu' pranks ensue!", as well as the supernatural associated with the night, "Bogies" (ghosts). The poem appeared in Ruddimans Weekly Magazine, November 1780, published by Walter Ruddiman in Edinburgh. That the Ayrshire poet Burns actually saw and was influenced by Mayne's composition is apparent, as he appears to communicate with Mayne's work, and also echoes some of his imagery. According to Burns, Halloween is "thought to be a night when witches, devils, and other mischief-making beings are all abroad on their baneful midnight errands".
