= Ocean Park Halloween Bash =

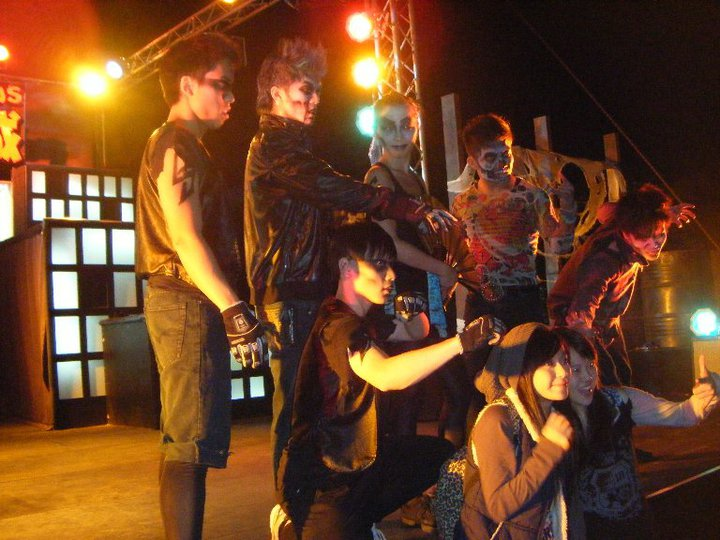
Ocean Park Halloween Bash

Ocean Park Halloween Bash (Chinese: 海洋公園哈囉喂) is an annual Halloween event held by Ocean Park Hong Kong. It contains haunted attractions and shows, the park area is decorated with Halloween decorations and full of Halloween characters that are dressed up by the officials. The Halloween Bash in Ocean Park started in 2001 and it held during late September to 1 November each year. It has changed to All-Day-and-Night Halloween Celebration in 2013.

== History ==
In 2001, Ocean Park started its first Halloween Bash. It claimed to be the first theme park holding Halloween celebration in Southeast Asia, with an investment above $15 million. The Halloween Bash period started from 19th to 31 October in its first year. The event aims to arouse more public interest not only by rides, but launching different festive celebrations. In 2001, Ocean Park created three representative halloween mascots: the Pumpkin King, the Witty Witch, and Count Dracula. The four haunted attractions are ‘Mini Maze”, ‘Superstition’, ‘Caverns of Darkness 3D’ and the ‘Underworld’; there are also Halloween events such as horror shows and games.

== Haunted Attractions ==
Year	Theme	Attractions
2015	15th anniversary	The Walking Dead: Survival (selected the most frightening scenes from among the five seasons of ‘The Walking Dead’ ) 15 Years of Horror(iconic scares and ghosts from yesteryears have came back)
2014	Horror-wood Studios	Phantom Studios and Horror-wood Studios Forest of Legends and Forest of Doom (Same area with different setting between day and night) Rigor Mortis LIVE(themed from local movie-Rigor Mortis) H14(first-ever limited-admission)
2013	World's largest giant pumpkin sculptures All Day and Night	Law Lan's Possessed Possessions( Artist Law Lan is playing the role of a whispering medium ) Murder Factory
2012	The “First”	5D Journey to the Underworld Terror of the Tombs(first haunted attraction featuring both interactive projection technology and a kinetic game) Eagle-eye Exorcist(first interactive Halloween-themed game incorporating eye-tracking technology)
2011	The Republic of Halloween	Fear Factory(solo walk-through journey) Nightmare in 3D(featured 3D projection system) Paper Doll Paradise
2010	Intensified guest participation	Zombie Hunt(laser tag battle between guest and zombie) Terror Park(first ever haunted attraction that features RFID (Radio-frequency identification) Exploring Burned Alive
2009	Hong Kong Local Ghost Stories of Yore	Police Station No.13 High Street Madness Purgatory Express(About the Headless Jane) The Ghastly Minshuku
2008	Hong Kong's seam of myths	The Canton Case(4th dimension audio-visual) The Estate of Horror(Own choice of experience) Deadly Doll Factory The Tomb of Doom(about terracotta army)
2007	Ancient ghost stories	Chung Kwai's Ghost Gourd The Last Stop(funeral procession into the world of the afterlife) Mad Doctor's Bizarre Lab

== Popularity ==
Ocean Park Halloween Bash has annual advertising videos and promotion events to increase popularity. Halloween bash attained its success that more than 150,000 visitors has visited Ocean Park in the first year. The attendance of the event has risen gradually since 2003, it has attracted over 380,000 visitors throughout the month, breaking all records of any October in the Park's 27-year History. Ocean Park Halloween Bash claimed to become one of the largest and most highly attended Halloween events in the world in 2006, about 500,000 visitors attended the great event.

== Controversies ==
=== 2009 ===
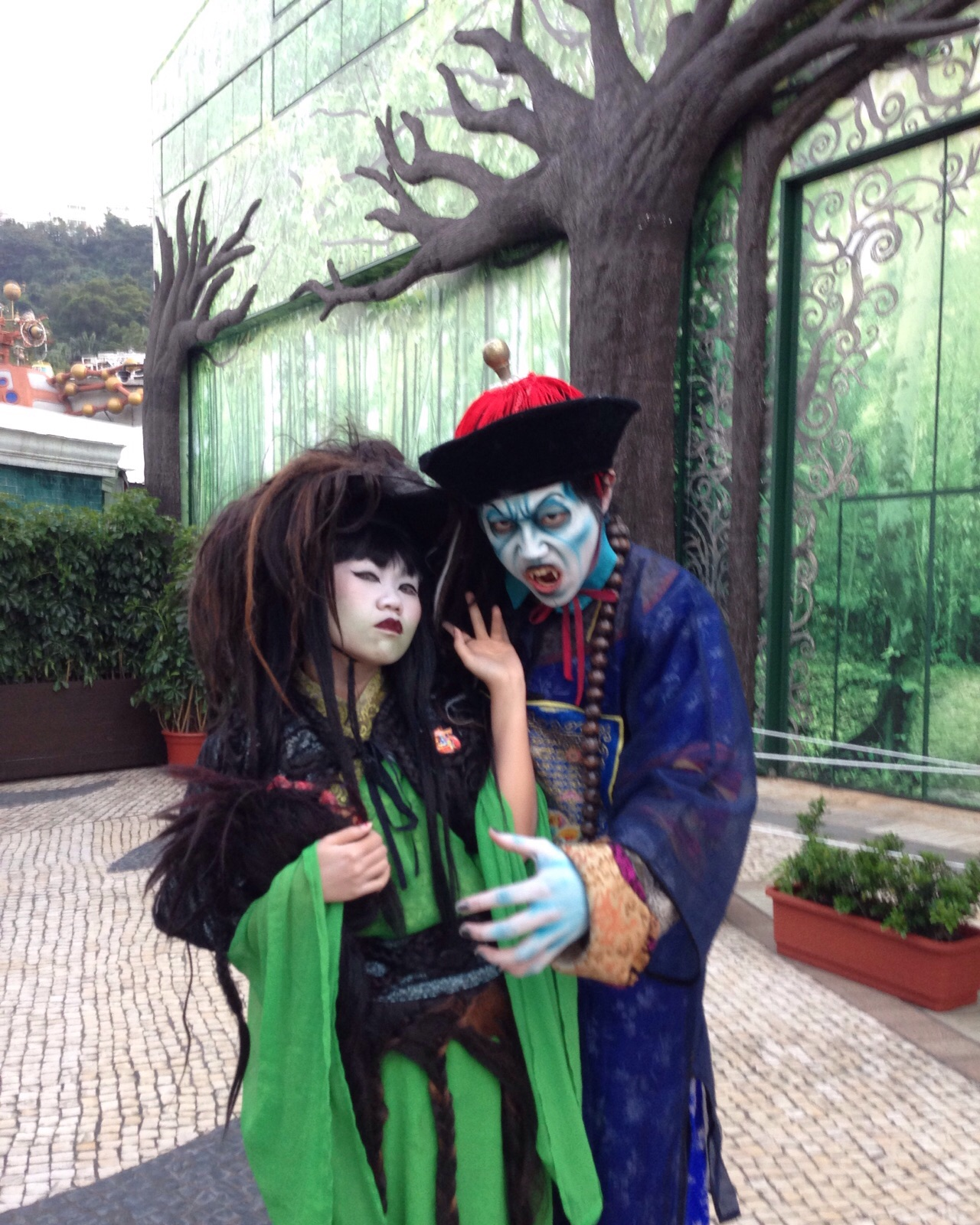
Ocean Park Halloween Bash staffs

Some officers who dressed up in Ocean Park Halloween Bash complained the costumes were not washed every day, and they were forced to wear the unsanitary costumes. As a result, some visitors chose not to take photos with them. This “smelly ghost” incident caused some negative comments that year.

=== 2010 ===
30 viewers complained about the advertisement of Ocean Park Halloween Bash in TVB jade. They criticized the advertisement which made them feel uneasy and horrible, and it preached superstition. At last, the Broadcasting Authority of Hong Kong ruled this complaint unreasonable because the TVB jade had made an adjustment of time on the advertisement.

=== 2011 ===
Eight youths attended the Ocean Park Halloween Bash and one of them was scared by a staff who dressed up as a clown. A male friend of hers abused the actor and both came into physical conflict. The clown's mask was broken and his mouth injured. Another officer also stood an assault during persuasion. The police came to the scene and arrested two youths involved.

=== 2012 ===
A Christian artist, Zac Kao, judged the advertisement of the Ocean Park Halloween Bash, advocated posthumous marriage and promote unhealthy messages. He posted a status in social media to persuade citizens not to attend the event. His persuasion was forwarded over 800 times and gained more than 5000 “likes”. At the same time there were many netizens criticized his opinions.
