= John Mayne =

Scottish printer, journalist and poet

John Mayne (1759–1836) was a Scottish printer, journalist and poet born in Dumfries. In 1780, his poem The Siller Gun appeared in its original form in Ruddiman's Magazine, published by Walter Ruddiman in Edinburgh. It is a humorous work on an ancient custom in Dumfries of shooting for the "Siller Gun." He also wrote a poem on Hallowe'en in 1780 which influenced Robert Burns's 1785 poem Halloween. Mayne also wrote a version of the ballad Helen of Kirkconnel. His verses were admired by Walter Scott.

== Life ==
He was born at Dumfries on 26 March 1759. Educated at the local grammar school, he became a printer in the office of the Dumfries Journal. In 1782 he went with his family to Glasgow, where he worked for five years in the publishing house of the brothers Foulis. In 1787 he settled in London, first as a printer, and then as proprietor and joint editor of The Star, an evening paper, in which he placed his poems. He died at Lisson Grove, London, 14 March 1836.

== Works ==
Mayne wrote poetry in Dumfries, and after 1777 he contributed poems to Ruddiman's Weekly Magazine, Edinburgh. Between 1807 and 1817 several of his lyrics appeared in the Gentleman's Magazine.

Mayne's Siller Gun was based on a Dumfries wapinschaw: the competitors were members of the corporations, and the prize a silver cannon-shaped tube presented by James VI. It consisted of twelve stanzas when it appeared in 1777. Enlarged to two cantos in 1779, and to three and four in 1780 and 1808 respectively, it took final shape in five cantos with notes in 1836. It was conceived in the spirit of Peblis to the Play.

Hallowe'en, published in Ruddiman's Weekly Magazine in November 1780, may have stimulated Burns's brilliant treatment of the same theme, according to Chambers, Life and Work of Burns (i. 154, ed. 1851). Logan Braes, which appeared in the Star, 23 May 1789, had two lines plagiarised by Burns in a Logan Braes of his own. Glasgow, published in the Glasgow Magazine in December 1783, was enlarged and issued in 1803. In the same year Mayne published a patriotic address English, Scots, and Irishmen.
