= Thomas Ruddiman =

Scottish classical scholar (1674–1757)

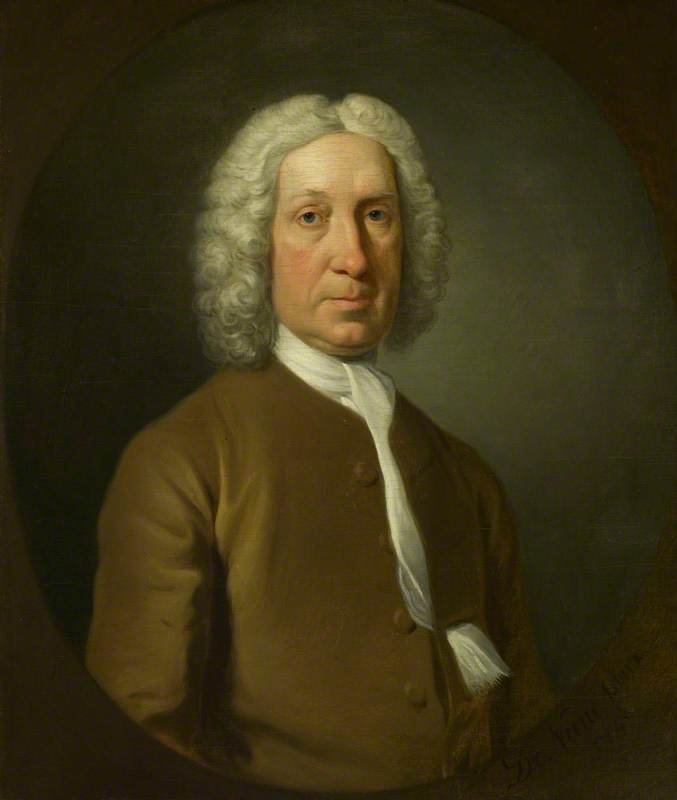
Ruddiman, 1749

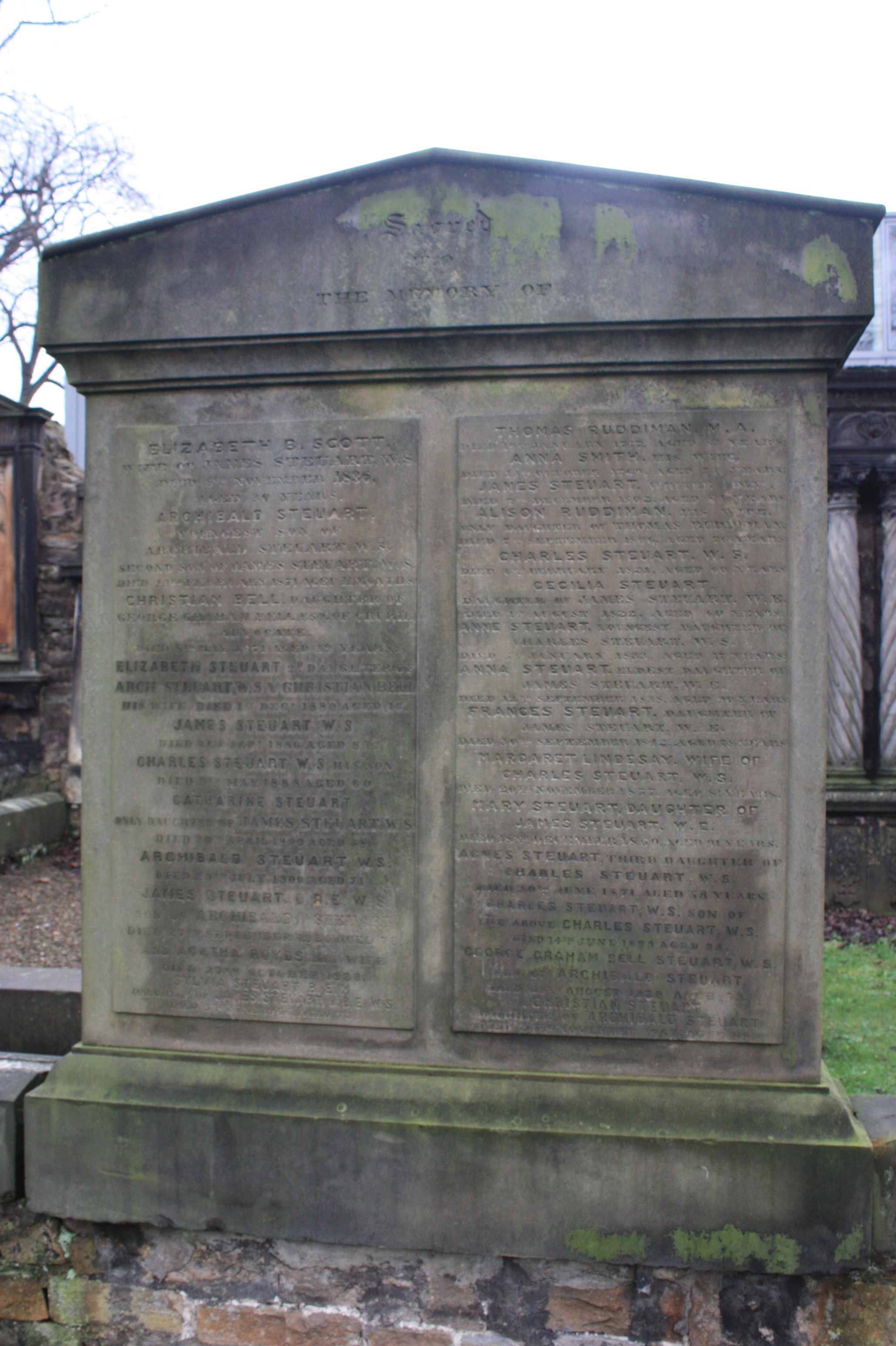
The grave of Thomas Ruddiman, Greyfriars Kirkyard

Thomas Ruddiman (October 1674 – 19 January 1757) was a Scottish classical scholar.

== Life ==
Ruddiman was born on a farm near Boyndie, three miles from Banff in Banffshire, where his father was a farmer.

He was educated locally and then studied at the University of Aberdeen. Initially from 1695, he was schoolmaster in Laurencekirk. Then in 1700, through the influence of Dr Archibald Pitcairne, he became an assistant in the Advocates' Library, Edinburgh. He founded (1715) a successful printing business, and in 1728 was appointed printer to the University of Edinburgh. He acquired the Caledonian Mercury in 1729, and in 1730 was appointed keeper of the Advocates' Library, resigning in 1752.

He is buried at Greyfriars Kirkyard, Edinburgh. The monument was erected in 1801 by his relative, Dr William Ruddiman. It stands in the north-west section of the graveyard.

== Family ==
He was married to Anna Smith (1694–1769).

His nephew Walter Ruddiman (1719–1781) also from Banff, similarly established a successful business in Edinburgh as a printer and publisher.

== Works ==
His main early writings were editions of Florence Wilson's De Animi Tranquillitate Dialogus (1707), and the Cantici Solomonis Paraphrasis Poetica (1709) of Arthur Johnston (1587–1641), editor of the Deliciae Poetarum Scotorum. On the death of Dr Pitcairne he edited his friend's Latin verses, and arranged for the sale of his valuable library to Peter the Great of Russia.

In 1714 he published Rudiments of the Latin Tongue, which was long used in Scottish schools. In 1715 he edited, with notes and annotations, the works of George Buchanan in two volumes folio. As Ruddiman was a Jacobite, Buchanan's liberal views invited his criticism. A society of scholars was formed in Edinburgh to "vindicate that incomparably learned and pious author from the calumnies of Mr Thomas Ruddiman"; but Ruddiman's remains the standard edition, though George Logan, John Love, James Man and others attacked him with vehemence.

Other works were: An edition of Gavin Douglas's translation of Virgil's Aeneid (1710), with an extensive Older Scots glossary; the editing and completion of James Anderson's Selectus Diplomatum et Numismatum Scotiae Thesaurus (1739); Catalogue of the Advocates' Library (1733–42); and a famous edition of Livy (1751). He also helped Joseph Ames with his Typographical Antiquities.

Ruddiman was for many years the representative scholar of Scotland. Writing in 1766, Dr Johnson, after reproving James Boswell for some bad Latin, significantly adds--"Ruddiman is dead." When Boswell proposed to write Ruddiman's life, "I should take pleasure in helping you to do honour to him", said Johnson.
