= Coco (folklore) =

Mythical ghost-monster

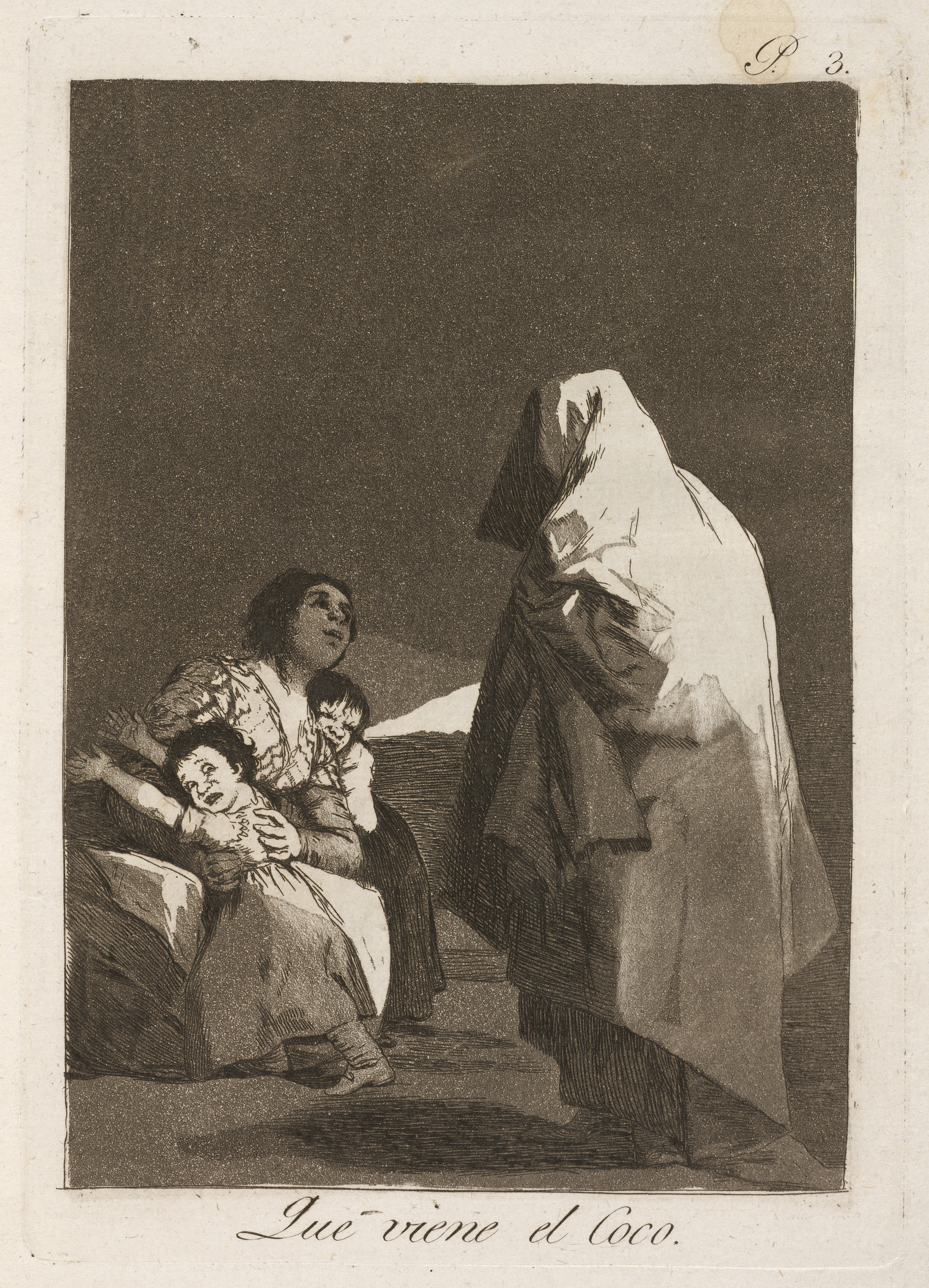
Que Viene el Coco (1799) by Goya

The Coco or Coca (also known as the Cucuy, Cuco, Cuca, Cucu, Cucuí or El Cucuí) is a mythical ghost-like monster, equivalent to the bogeyman, found in Portugal and Spain. Those beliefs have also spread in many Hispanophone and Lusophone countries. It can also be considered an Iberian version of a bugbear as it is a commonly used figure of speech representing an irrational or exaggerated fear. The Cucuy is a male being while Cuca is a female version of the mythical monster. The "monster" will come to the house of disobedient children at night and take them away.

== Names and etymology ==
The myth of the Coco, or Cucuy, originated in northern Portugal and Galicia. The word coco is used in colloquial speech to refer to the human head in Spanish. Coco also means "skull". The words cocuruto in Portuguese and cocorota in Spanish both means "the crown of the head" or "the highest place" and with the same etymology in Galicia, crouca means "head", from proto-Celtic *krowkā-, with variant cróca; and either coco or cuca means "head" in both Portuguese and Galician. It is cognate with Cornish crogen, meaning "skull", and Breton krogen ar penn, also meaning "skull". In Irish, clocan means "skull".

Many Latin American countries refer to the monster as El Cuco. In northern New Mexico and southern Colorado, where there is a large Hispanic population, it is referred to by its anglicized name, "the Coco Man". In Brazilian folklore, the monster is referred to as Cuca and pictured as a female humanoid alligator with blond hair. Though this reptilian form resembles the Portuguese coca, a dragon, it actually originates from the 1952's TV show Sítio do Pica-pau Amarelo (1952 TV series). In the only book she appears, O saci (1921), Cuca's description is vague, Monteiro Lobato only states that she had an "alligator face" and "clawed fingers". So, while the first film adaptation, O saci (1951), represented her as an old woman, the show runners of the 1952's show interpreted her as a full alligator.

== Legend ==
In Spain, Portugal, and Latin America, parents sometimes invoke the Coco or Cuca as a way of discouraging their children from misbehaving; they sing lullabies or tell rhymes warning their children that if they don't obey their parents, el Coco will come and get them and then eat them.

It is not the way the Coco looks but what it does that scares most. It is a child eater and a kidnapper; it may immediately devour the child, leaving no trace, or it may spirit the child away to a place of no return, but it only does this to disobedient children. It is on the lookout for children's misbehavior from the rooftops; it takes the shape of any dark shadow and stays watching. It represents the opposite of the guardian angel and is frequently compared to the devil. Others see the Coco as a representation of the deceased of the local community.

The oldest known rhyme about the Coco, which originated in the 17th century, is in the Auto de los desposorios de la Virgen by Juan Caxés.

The rhyme has evolved over the years, but still retains its original meaning:

Duérmete niño, duérmete ya...
Que viene el Coco y te comerá

Translation:

Sleep child, sleep or else...
Coco will come and eat you

The Portuguese lullaby recorded by José Leite de Vasconcelos tells Coca to go to the top of the roof. In other versions of the same lullaby, the name of Coca is changed to that of "papão negro" (black bogeyman), the name of another bogeyman.

Vai-te Coca. Vai-te Coca
Para cima do telhado
Deixa o menino dormir
Um soninho descansado

Translation:

Leave Coca. Leave Coca
Go to the top of the roof
Let the child have
A quiet sleep

The traditional Brazilian lullaby is as follows, with the Cuca as a female humanoid alligator:

Dorme neném
Que a Cuca vem pegar
Papai foi pra roça
Mamãe foi trabalhar

Translation:

Sleep little baby
That Cuca comes to get you
Daddy went to the farm
Mommy went to work

Both Brazilians and Portuguese also have a bogeyman version, which sometimes acquires regional colors where the bogeyman (the shape-shifting Bicho Papão is a monster that is shaped by what the child fears most) is a small owl, murucututu, or other birds of prey that could be on the roof of homes at night (in Brazil) or a mysterious old man with a bag who is also waiting on the roof of the house (in Portugal).

Bicho papão
Em cima do telhado
Deixa o meu menino dormir
Um soninho sossegado

Translation:

Bogeyman
Atop the roof
Let my child have
A quiet sleep

Verses and songs were used in pre-Roman Iberia to transmit history to the younger generations, as told by ancient authors. Sallust said the mothers sang the military feats of the fathers to incite the children to battle. He was later quoted by Servius, who emphasised that it was the role of the mothers to remember and teach the young men about the war feats of their fathers. Silius Italicus added more; he said that the young warriors sang songs in their native language while hitting their shields in the rhythm of the songs and that they were well versed in magic. Strabo, too, commented that history was recorded in verse.

During the Portuguese and Spanish colonization of Latin America, the legend of the Coco was spread to countries such as Mexico, Argentina, Uruguay and Chile.

== Physical representations ==
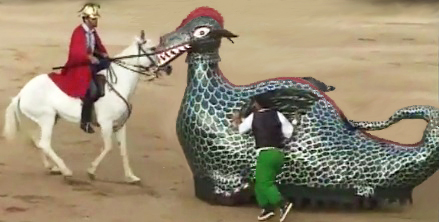
Festa da Coca during the Corpus Christi celebration, in Monção, Portugal

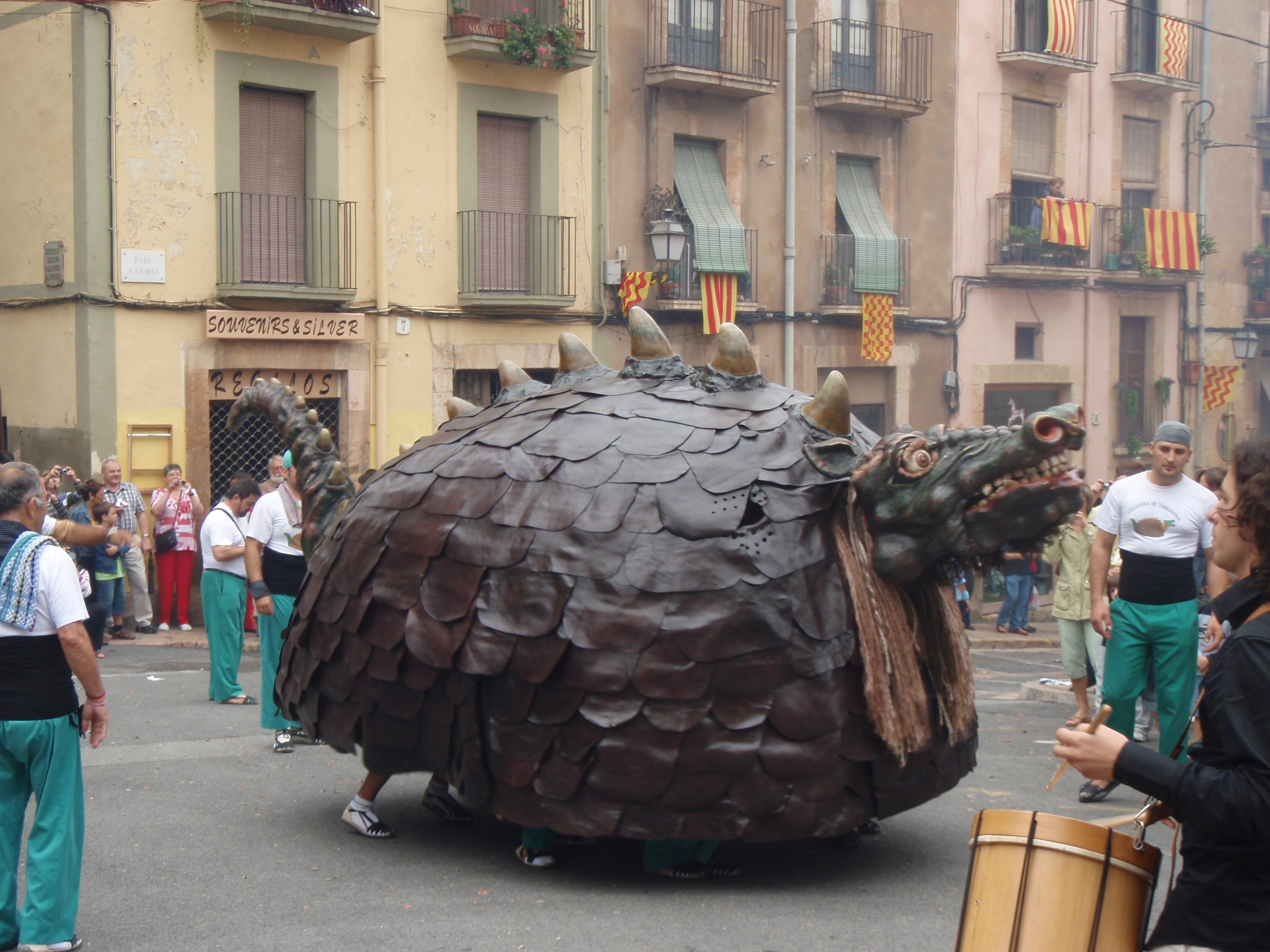
Cucafera during the Festa Major de Santa Tecla in Tarragona, Spain

There is no general description of the cucuy, as far as facial or body descriptions; however, it is stated that this shapeshifting being is extremely horrible to look at. The coco is variously described as a shapeless figure, sometimes a hairy monster, that hides in closets or under beds and eats children that misbehave when they are told to go to bed.

=== Mythical animals ===
Coca is also the name of a female dragon who featured in various medieval celebrations in the Iberian Peninsula. In Portugal one still survives in Monção; she fights in some sort of medieval tournament with Saint George during the Corpus Christi celebrations. She is called Santa Coca ("Saint Coca"), an allusion to the Irish saint, or Coca rabicha ("Tailed Coca"). If she defeats Saint George by scaring the horse, there will be a bad year for the crops and famine; if the horse and Saint George win by cutting off one of her ears with earring and her tongue, the crops will be fertile. Oddly enough, the people cheer for Saint Coca. In Galicia there are still two dragon cocas, one in Betanzos and the other in Redondela. The legend says that the dragon arrived from the sea and was devouring the young women until she died in combat by the young men of the city. In Monção, the legend says, she lives in the Minho; in Redondela she lives in the Ria of Vigo. The dragon shared the same name that was given in Portuguese and Spanish to the cog (a type of ship), and although used mainly for trade, it was also a war vessel common in medieval warfare and piracy raids on coastal villages.

The oldest reference to Coca is in the book Livro 3 de Doações de D. Afonso III from the year 1274, where it is referred to as a big fish that appears on the shore: "And if by chance any whale or sperm whale or mermaid or coca or dolphin or Musaranha or other large fish that resembles some of these die in Sesimbra or Silves or elsewhere[.]"

In Catalonia, the Cuca fera de Tortosa was first documented in 1457. It is a zoomorphic figure that looks like a tortoise with a horned spine, dragon claws and a dragon head. The legend says she had to dine every night on three cats and three children. This legend of the Coca can be compared to the one of Peluda or Tarasque.

In Brazil, the Coco appears as a humanoid female alligator called Cuca. She is dressed like a woman with ugly hair and a sack on her back. Cuca appears as one of the main villains in children's books Sítio do Picapau Amarelo by Monteiro Lobato, but in the books she appears like a powerful witch that attacks innocent children. Artists illustrating these books depicted the Cuca as an anthropomorphic alligator. She is an allusion to Coca, a dragon from the folklore of Portugal and Galicia.

=== Heads ===
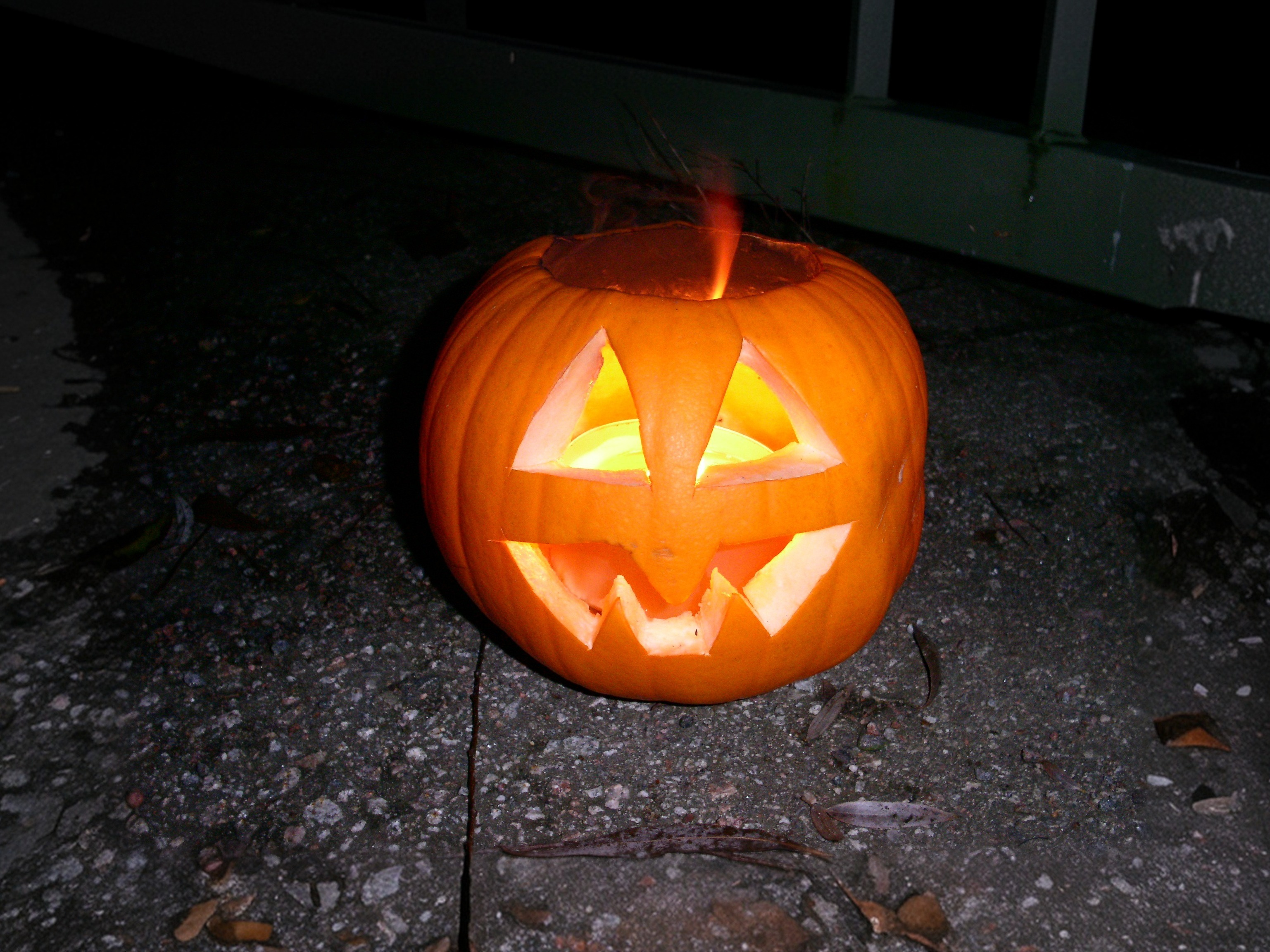
In Portuguese, the skull-like carved vegetable lanterns are called "coco" or "coca".

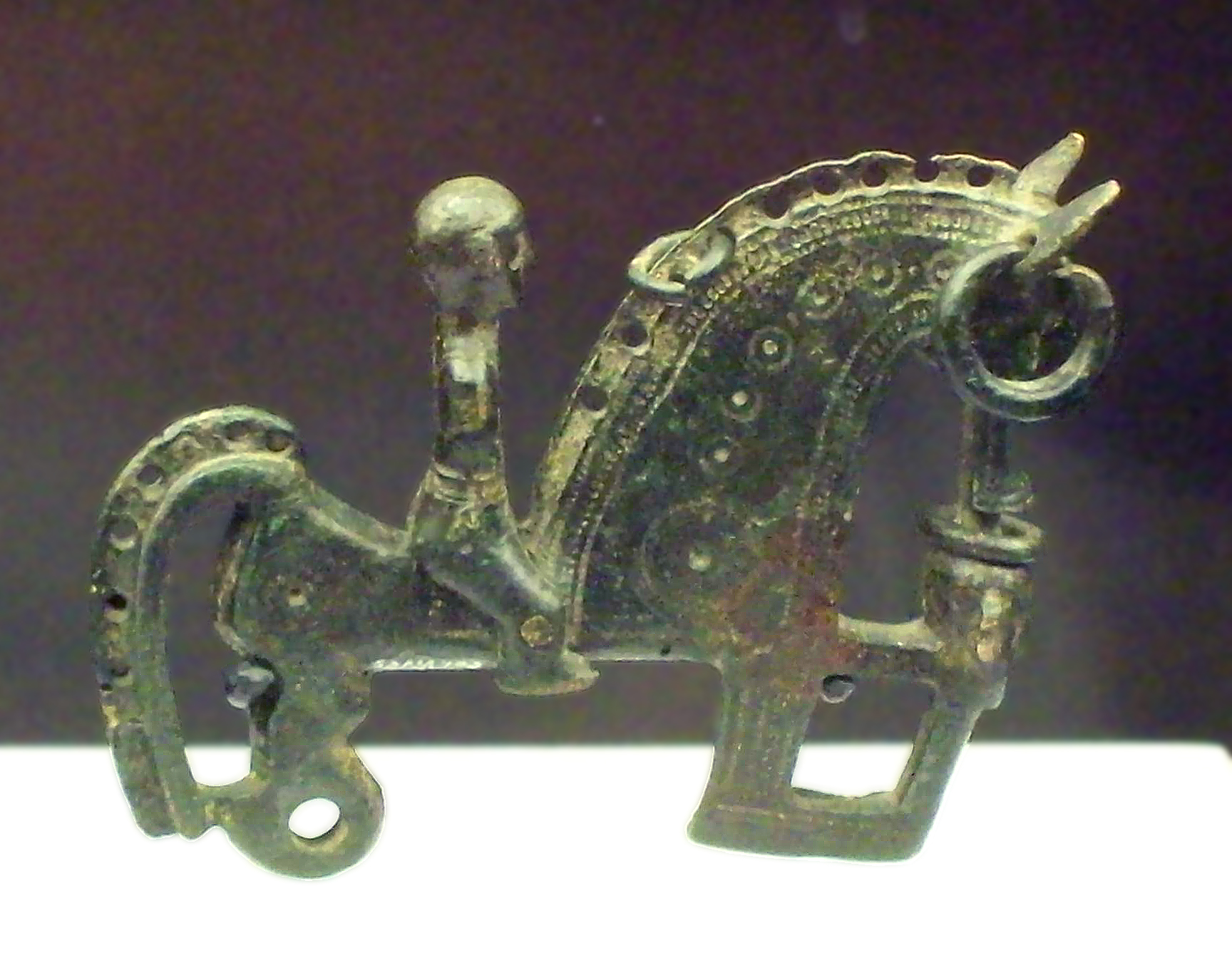
Bronze Celtiberian fibula representing a warrior carrying a severed head

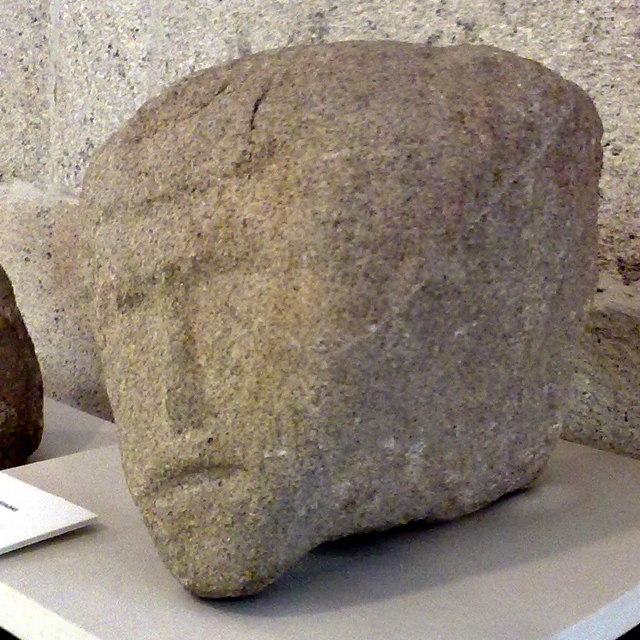
A Galaico-Lusitanian 'severed head' from Castro culture

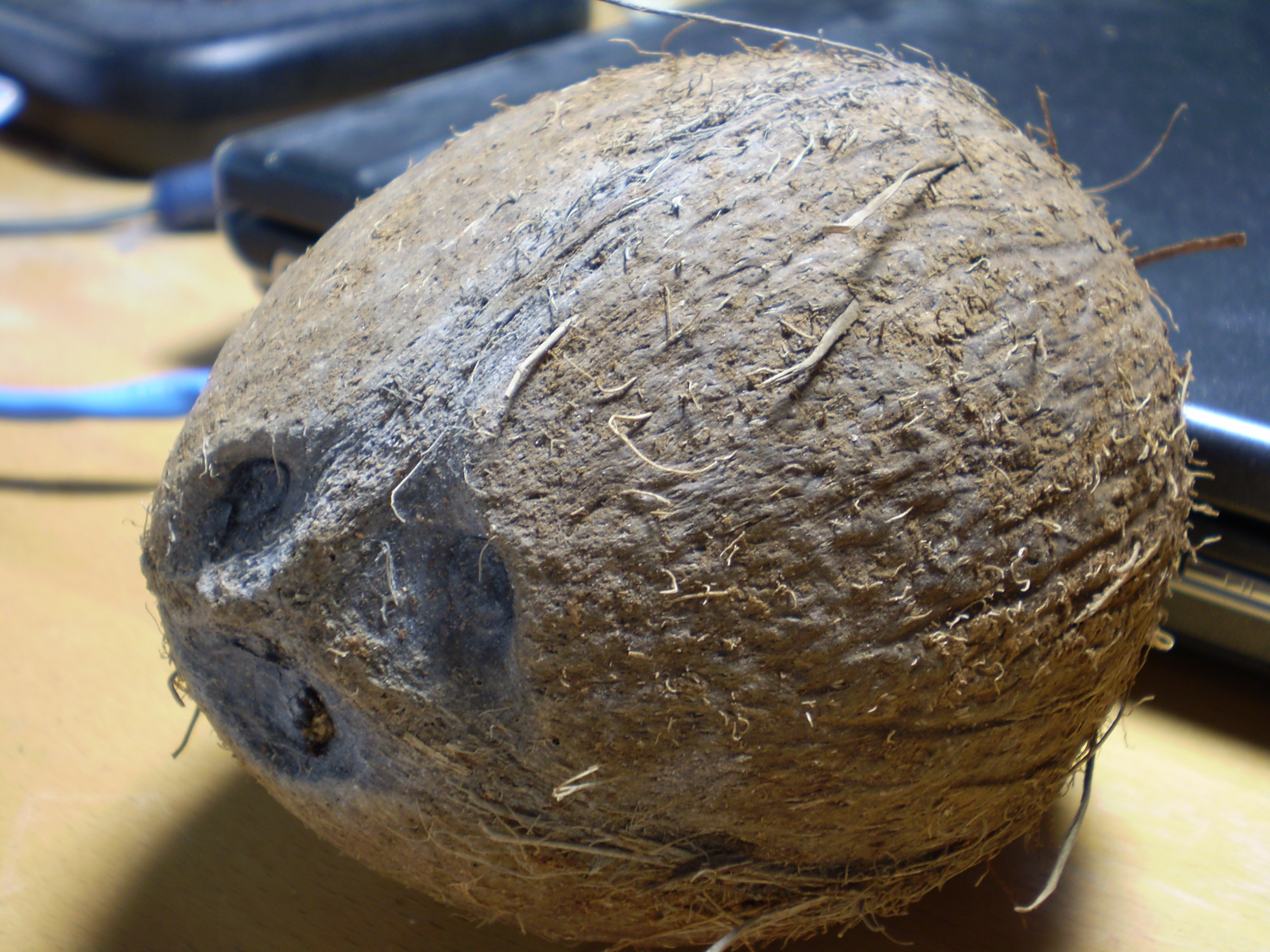
The sailors of Vasco da Gama called the fruit of the Polynesian palm tree "coco". The word "coconut" is derived from their name.

In Portugal, however, the coco is traditionally represented by an iron pan with holes, to represent a face, with a light inside; or by a vegetable lantern carved from a pumpkin with two eyes and a mouth, which is left in dark places with a light inside to scare people. In the Beiras, heads carved on pumpkins, called coca, would be carried by the village boys, stuck on top of wooden stakes.

The same name [Coca] is given to the pumpkin perforated with the shape of a face, with a candle burning in the inside—this gives the idea of a skull on fire—that the boys on many lands of our Beira carry stuck on a stick.

An analogous custom was first mentioned by Diodorus Siculus (XIII.56.5;57.3), in which Iberian warriors, after the battle of Selinunte, in 469 BC, would hang the heads of the enemies on their spears. According to Rafael López Loureiro, this carving representation would be a milenar tradition from the Celtiberian region that spread all over the Iberian Peninsula.

The autumnal and childish custom of emptying pumpkins and carving on its bark, eyes, nose and mouth looking for a sombre expression, far from being a tradition imported by a recent Americanizing cultural mimicry, is a cultural trait in ancient Iberian Peninsula.

This representation would be related to the Celtic cult of the severed heads in the Iberian Peninsula. According to João de Barros, the name of the "coconut" derived from coco and was given to the fruit by the sailors of Vasco da Gama, c.1498, because it reminded them of this mythical creature.

This bark from which the pome receives its vegetable nourishment, which is through its stem, has an acute way, which wants to resemble a nose placed between two round eyes, from where it throws the sprout, when it wants to be born; by reason of such figure, it was called by our [men] coco, name imposed by the women on anything they want to put fear to the children, this name thus remained, as no one knows another.

Rafael Bluteau (1712) observes that the coco and coca were thought to look like skulls, in Portugal:

Coco or Coca. We make use of these words to frighten children, because the inner shell of the Coco has on its outside surface three holes giving it the appearance of a skull.

In the first half of the 20th century, the coca was an integral part of festivities like All Souls' Day and the ritual begging of Pão-por-Deus. The tradition of Pão-por-Deus, already mentioned in the 15th century, is a ritual begging for bread and cakes, done door to door by children, though in the past poor beggars would also take part. Its purpose is to share the bread or treats gathered door to door with the dead of the community, who were eagerly awaited and arrived at night in the shape of butterflies or little animals, during the traditional magusto. In Portugal, depending on the region, the Pão-por-Deus assumes different names: santoro or santorinho, dia dos bolinhos (cookies day), or fieis de deus. This same tradition extends to Galicia, where it is called migallo. It has a close resemblance with the traditions of souling or nowadays trick-or-treating. While the Pão-por-Deus or Santoro is the bread or offering given to the souls of the dead, the Molete or Samagaio is the bread or offering that is given when a child is born.

In this same city of Coimbra, where we find ourselves today, it is customary for groups of children to walk on the streets, on the 31st October and 1st and 2nd November, at nightfall, with a hollow pumpkin with holes that were cut out pretending to be eyes, nose and mouth, as if it was a skull, and with a stump of candle lit from within, to give it a more macabre look.

In Coimbra the begging mentions "Bolinhos, bolinhós" and the group brings an emptied pumpkin with two holes representing the eyes of a personage and a candle lit in the inside [...] another example of the use of the pumpkin or gourd as a human representation, is in the masks of the muffled young men during the desfolhada, the communal stripping of the maize, in Santo Tirso de Prazins (Guimarães), which after, they carry hoisted on a stick and with a candle in the inside, and leave them stuck on any deserted place to put fear to who is passing by.

To ensure that the souls found their way back home, the Botador de almas, whose mission was to lay souls (botar almas), would go every night through valleys and mountains and up on trees ringing a little bell, or carrying a lantern and singing a prayer to the souls. Every Portuguese village had one. Calling and singing to the souls is an ancient tradition done either by one person alone or in groups and it has many names: "lançar as almas", "encomendar as almas", "amentar as almas", "deitar as almas", "cantar às almas santas".

The serandeiros are disguised young men, covered with a blanket, a bed sheet or a hooded cloak. They carry a staff (a stick of quince or of honeyberry, about their own height) in one hand, and in the other they carry a small bundle of basil or apples that they make the girls that take part of the desfolhada smell, or with which they tickle people's cheeks; sometimes, to play a prank, they bring stinging nettles. When a girl recognizes the serandeiro or if she recognizes her boyfriend masked as a serandeiro, she throws him an apple brought from home. The serandeiros represent the spirits of the dead, the spirits of nature.

The heads would have protective and healing powers, protecting people and communities. They would also be cherished for their divinatory, prophetic and healing powers. The display places for the Iron Age severed heads were in the inside or outside of buildings with a preference for public places, with streets and people passing by and always preferring high places.

=== Our Ladies ===
In Portugal, rituals among the Catholic religious order of Our Lady of Cabeza, a Black Madonna, include the offering of heads of wax to the Lady, praying the Hail Mary while keeping a small statue of Our Lady on top of the head; the pilgrims pray with their own heads inside a hole in the wall of the chapel. The Chapel of Our Lady of the Heads (Nossa Senhora das Cabeças) situated 50 m (160 ft) northwest of the ruins of the Roman era temple of Our Lady of the Heads (Orjais, Covilhã) evidences a continuity in the use of a sacred space that changed from a pagan worship cult area to a Christian one and continued to be a place of worship for centuries after. According to Pedro Carvalho, the pre-Roman findings and the unusual location of the ruins inside an 8th-century BC hillfort suggest it was the place of a pre-Roman cult.

The Lady of the Head and Lady of the Heads are two of the many names given to Our Lady. Several of her names are thought to be of pre-Roman origin. Names like Senhora da Noite (lit. 'Lady of the Night'), Senhora da Luz ("Lady of the Light"), Señora de Carbayo ("Lady of the Oak Tree") are spread all over the peninsula. In Portugal alone 972 titles for Our Lady have been found in churches, altars and images, not including the names of villages and places. Spain has a similar proliferation of titles for Our Lady.

The common element to all these names is the title Lady. But the title Senhora (Portuguese) or Señora (Spanish) is of Latin origin, and derives from the Latin senior; thus there had to be another one of pre-Roman origin. In ancient times the titles that were used in Portugal by the ladies of the court were Meana (me Ana) or Miana (mi Ana) and Meona (me Ona); these words meant the same as miLady, that is, Ana and Ona were synonyms of Senhora and Dona. Ana is the name of the river Guadiana, thus pre-Roman in origin. Ana is also the name of a goddess of Irish mythology.

In the village of Ponte, parish of Mouçós, on a hill that overlooks the River Corgo, there is a chapel called Santo Cabeço which legend says was built by the mouros encantados. On the wall facing south there is a hole, where legend says the mouros used to put their head to hear the sound of the sea. The local people also have the custom of putting their head inside the hole: some to hear the whisper that is similar to the waves of the sea, others to heal headaches.

In Alcuéscar, Spain, a legend says that a princess exhibited a stall of skulls and human bones.

=== Hooded cloak ===
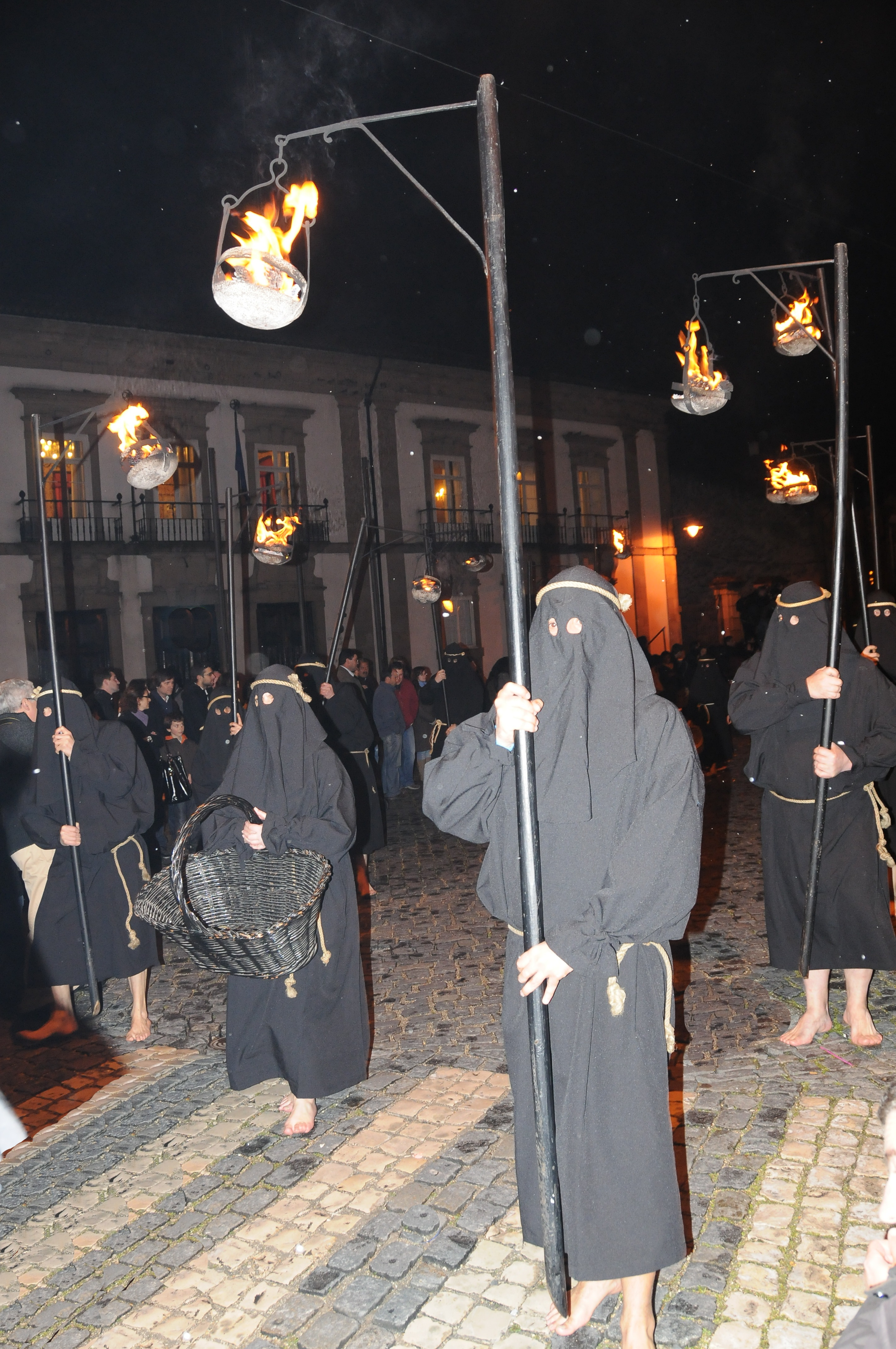
The Farricoco in the procession "Ecce Homo" on Maundy Thursday, in Braga, Portugal.

In Portugal, coca is a name for a hooded cloak; it was also the name of the traditional hooded black wedding gown still in use at the beginning of the 20th century. In Portimão during the holy week celebrations, in the procissão dos Passos (Spanish: Procesión de los Pasos), a procession organized by the Catholic brotherhoods, the herald, a man dressed with a black hooded cloak that covered his face and had three holes for the eyes and mouth, led the procession and announced the death of Christ. This man was either named coca, farnicoco, (farricunco, farricoco from Latin far, farris and coco) or death. The name coca was given to the cloak and to the man who wore the cloak.

In 1498, the Portuguese King Manuel I gave permission to the Catholic brotherhood of the Misericórdia to collect the bones and remains from the gallows of those that had been condemned to death and put them in a grave every year on All Saints' Day. The brotherhood in a procession, known as Procissão dos Ossos, were followed by the farricocos, who carried the tombs and collected the bones.

In the travels of the Baron Rozmital, 1465–1467, a paragraph was written commenting on the traditional mourning clothes of the Portuguese of that time. The relatives of the deceased who accompanied his funeral would be clad in white and hooded like monks, but the paid mourners would be arrayed in black."[...] white was worn as the garb of mourning until the time of King Manuel, at the death of whose aunt, Philippa, black was adopted for the first time in Portugal as the symbol of sorrow for the dead".

=== Giants ===
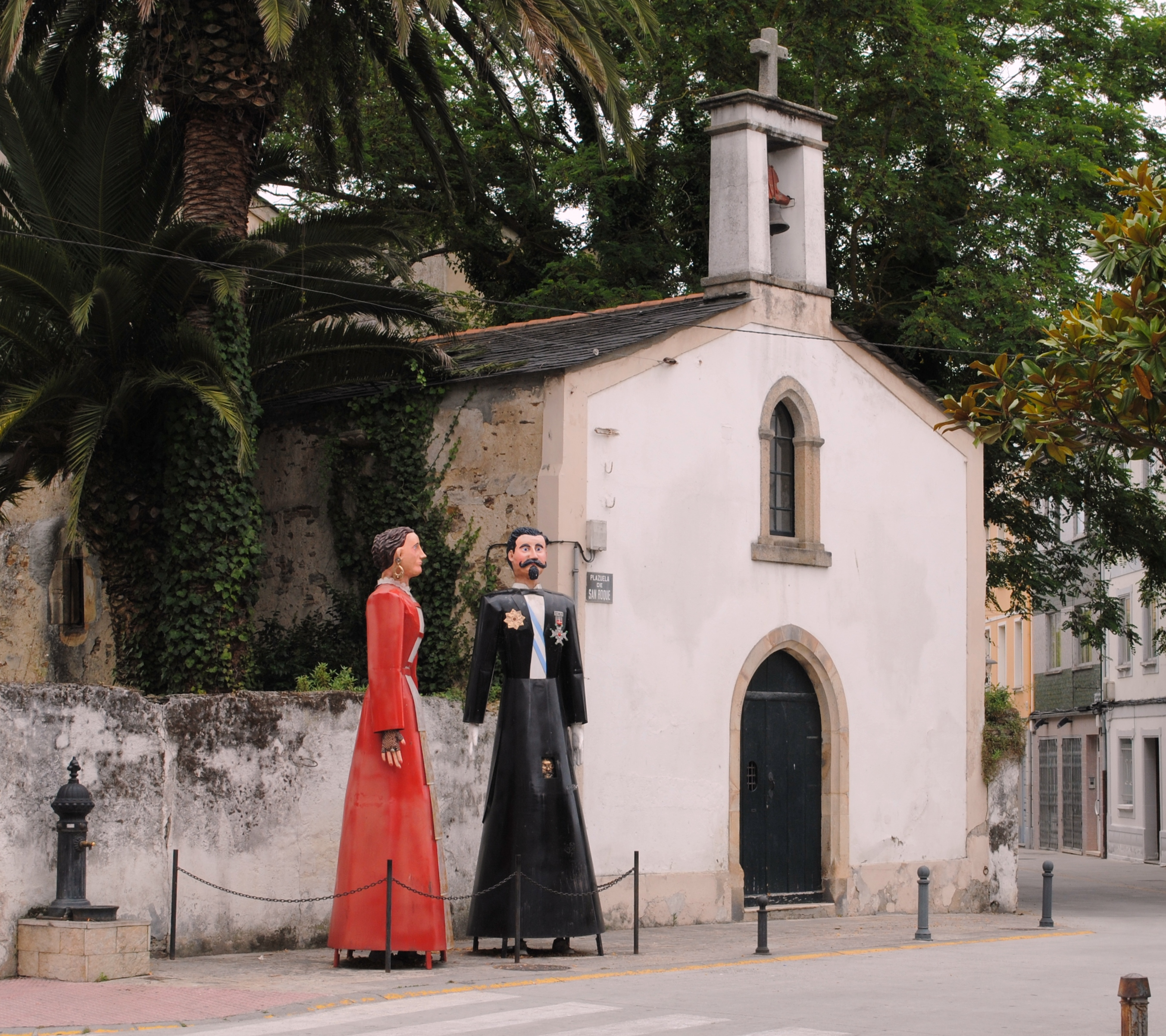
Os cocos, giant representation of the coco and coca of Ribadeo. The tradition dates back to the 19th century.

In Ribadeo, two giant figures represent "el coco y la coca" that dance at the sound of drummers and Galician bagpipe players.

=== The land of the dead ===
The 'land of the dead' is a mythic land which appears in traditions from various cultures around the ancient world.

Probably the oldest mention of a mythic land of the dead located in the Iberian Peninsula is in the Lebor Gabála Érenn.

The legends of Portugal and Spain speak of an enchanted land, the Mourama, the land where an enchanted people, the Mouros (Celtic *MRVOS) dwell under the earth in Portugal and Galicia. The lore of Galicia says that "In Galicia there are two overlapped people: a part lives on the surface of the land; they are the Galician people, and the other in the subsoil, the Mouros". Mourama is the otherworld, the world of the dead from where everything comes back.

The Mourama is ruled by an enchanted being who is called rei Mouro (king Mouro). His daughter is the princesa Moura (princess Moura), a shapeshifter who changes herself into a snake, also called bicha Moura, or can even be seen riding a dragon.

== In popular culture ==
In the last chapter of the work of Miguel de Cervantes, the epitaph of Don Quijote identifies him as the scarecrow and el coco.

Tuvo a todo el mundo en poco,
fue el espantajo y el coco
del mundo, en tal coyuntura,
que acreditó su ventura
morir cuerdo y vivir loco

— Don Quixote by Miguel de Cervantes
Translation:

He scorned everyone,
he was the scarecrow and the coco of the world,
in such a conjuncture,
that he credited his fortune
to die sane and to live insane

Que Viene el Coco, a painting that depicts a cloaked, menacing figure, was painted by Goya in 1799.

The Cuco appears in AdventureQuest Worlds. It is among the creatures that attack Terra da Festa before the Carnaval Party. The Cuco resembles a Carnaval version of Blister. The Cuca later appears where it is depicted as a humanoid alligator in witch attire.

A wealthy family of Cucuys appear in Wizards of Waverly Place episode "Alex Gives Up". Their abilities include shapeshifting in which they can change their face to a dark-gray skull shape, with large red eyes.

On the television series Grimm, in the fifth episode of season three, El Cucuy poses as a little, old lady who answers the prayers of crime victims, changes into beast form, and brutally slays criminals, thus rendering a version of vigilante justice that is a departure from the standard El Cucuy legend.

Stephen King's 2018 novel The Outsider (and the 2020 TV miniseries based on King's novel) features a variation of El Cuco as its main villain.

El Cucuy is featured in The Casagrandes episode "Monster Cash," voiced by Eric Bauza.

The Mexican stop motion series Frankelda's Book of Spooks episode "Let's Get Out of Darkness" features Coco Jr., the son of the child stealing Don Coco, depicted as a furry creature with eight limbs and a horned lizard-like face. A music lover, Coco Jr. steals childhood passions for music and the arts to create a ghostly orchestra and tricks a bullied theremin player named Tere into giving away her talents to him. Don Coco appears in the prequel film I Am Frankelda as one of the seven clan leaders of Topus Terrentus, resembling a monstrous version of Porfirio Díaz.

El Cucuy is the nickname of American mixed martial artist Tony Ferguson.

"El Coco" is a children's book written by Linda Uruburu and illustrated by Helen Schneider. It tells the story of a young Basque girl, Lenny, whose adventurous spirit and colorful imagination take her cousins on a fun filled, exciting, and sometimes scary escapade. This summer her plan is to convince her cousins to find “El Coco”, the monster of legend, that she believes kidnapped a local boy. "El Coco" is filled with Basque folklore, language and customs. Published in 2025 by World Castle Publishing.

== See also ==
- Calaca
- Hidebehind
- Jack-o'-lantern
- Madam Koi Koi
- Sack man
