= Allerheiligenstriezel =

Braided Christmas bread from Germany and Austria

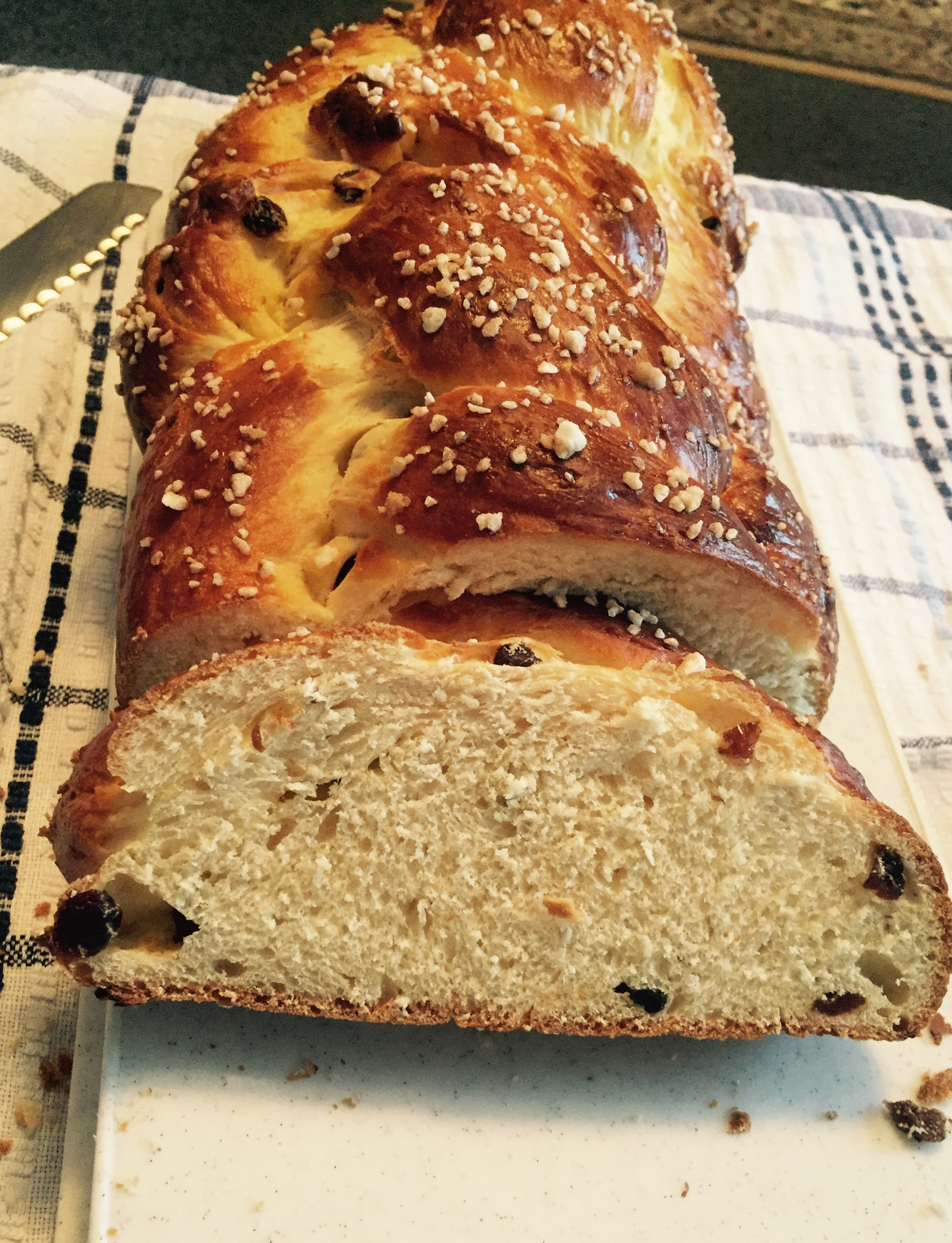
- Alternative names: Strietzel, Allerseelenzopf, Allerseelenbreze, Seelenspitze, Seelenbrot
- Type: Pastry
- Place of origin: Austria, Germany (Bavaria)
- Main ingredients: Flour, eggs, yeast, shortening or butter, raisins, milk

Allerheiligenstriezel (pronounced [alɐˈhaɪlɪɡn̩ˌʃtʁiːtsl̩]) or simply Striezel or Strietzel (regional names include Allerseelenzopf, Seelenspitze, Seelenbrot, or Allerseelenbreze) is a braided yeast pastry. Its name means "All Saints' braid" in English and it consists of flour, eggs, yeast, shortening or butter, raisins, milk, salt, and decorating sugar or poppy seeds. Some regional variations also include rum or lemon juice.

The word Striezel is derived from Middle High German strutzel, strützel, in turn from Old High German struzzil. Its further origin is unclear.

== History ==
The first known mention of Striezel in the form of Heiligenstriezel comes from a Nachrichtenbuech (lit. 'news book') from Saxen in Upper Austria. The early versions of this bread were unbraided and made with a simple dough of wheat, eggs, fat and honey. In later years more complicated braided loaves became customary. In 1840, Der Österreichische Zuschauer described a custom among the Viennese to exchange the braided loaves on All Saint's Day. In 1929, the mastery of different types of braiding were added to the Bakers Master Examination Regulations in Upper Austria.

== Traditions ==
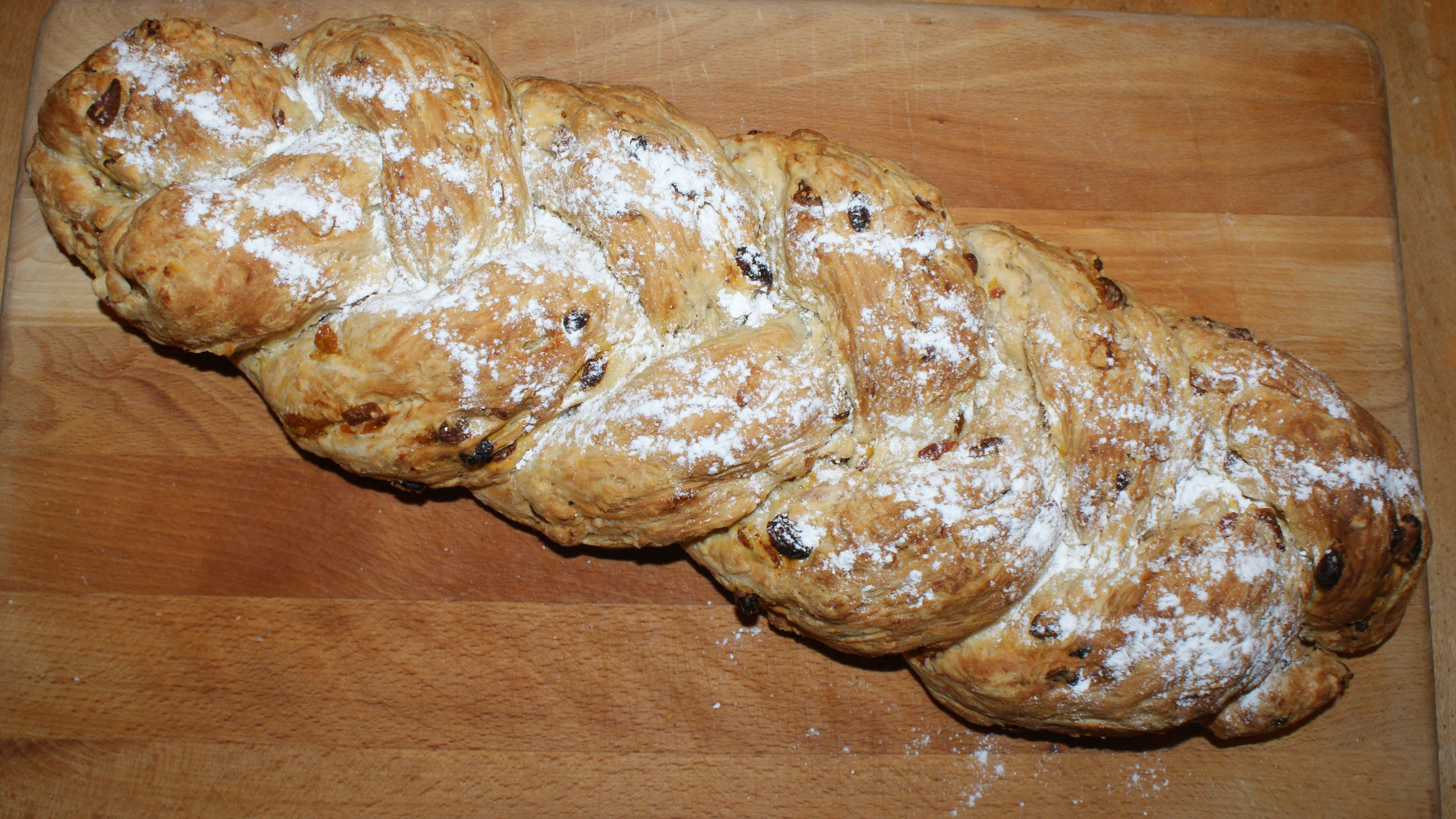
An unglazed Christmas Striezel with raisins and flaked almonds, sprinkled with icing sugar

In Austria and Bavaria Striezel is given to godchildren by their godfathers for All Saints' Day. This tradition has its origin in the ancient funeral cults in which mourning was expressed by a woman's cutting off her braided hair. In the 19th century, it was common to give this rich kind of cake to the poor due to a depiction by the Austrian (Styria) vernacular writer Peter Rosegger. Especially for children in rural areas, the present meant a recompense for poor food and times of hunger throughout the year. Also common (especially in Linz) was the superstition that the luck of the forthcoming year depends on the success of the pastry. If the yeast did not work and the dough did not rise, disaster or death were supposed to follow. Another practice of young men was to mock single women because of their singleness by giving them Striezels made of straw.

In Dresden, the cake is now generally called Dresdner [Christ]stollen, Stollen being an unplaited German cake with a similar recipe. However, its name in the city used to be Dresdner Striezel, and from 1434 gave its name to the Dresdner Striezelmarkt (Dresden Striezel Market). A cake of that name is still (2014) baked in Dresden as a Christmas speciality.

== See also ==
- Challah
- Pão por Deus
- Soul cake
- Zopf
