= Pan de ánimas =

Bread made in offering to the dead

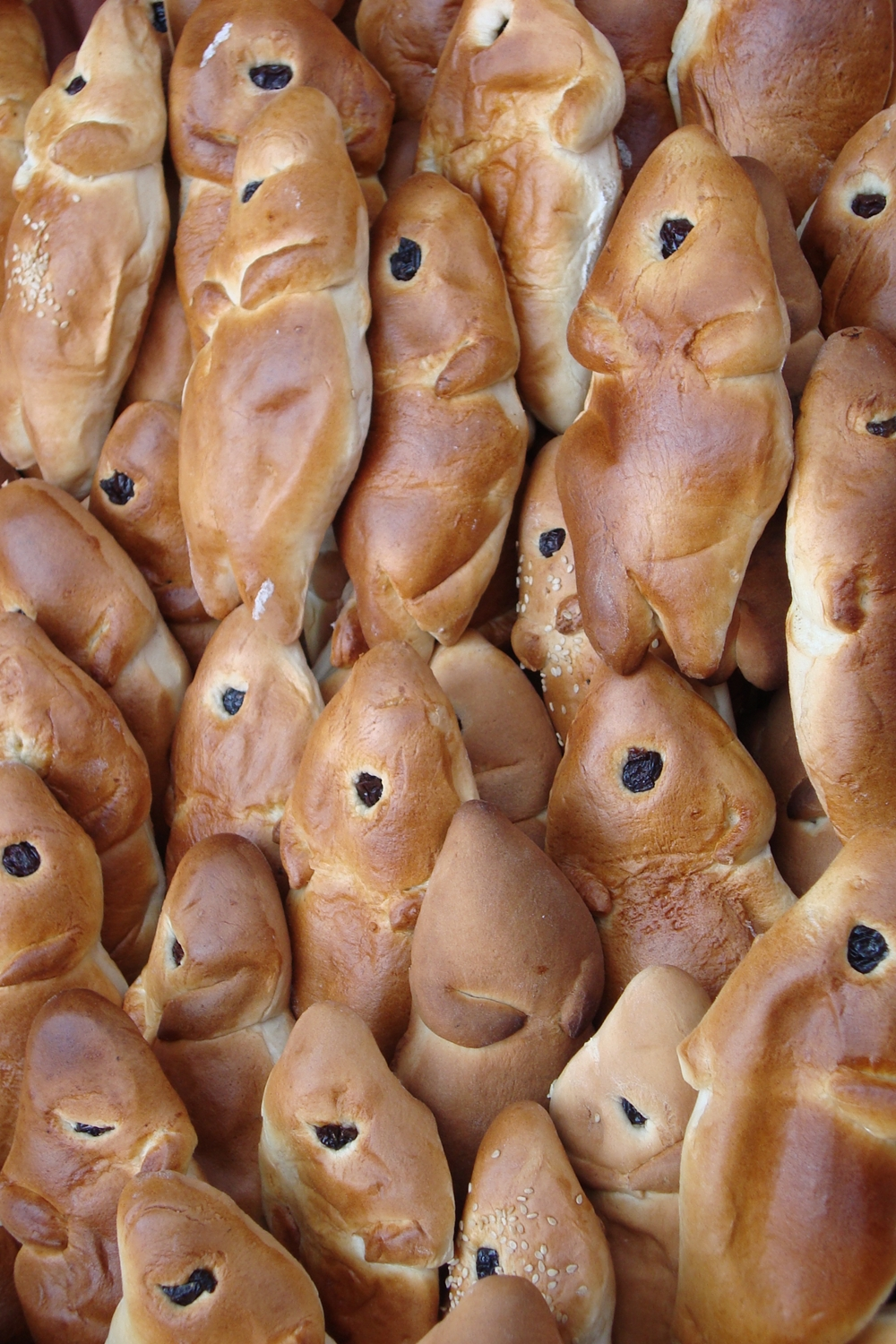
Panes de muerto in the shape of people

Formerly in Spain, the pan de ánimas ('bread of souls'), pan de difunto ('bread of the deceased') or pan de muerto ('bread of the dead') were breads that were prepared, blessed and offered to deceased loved ones during All Saints' Day and All Souls' Day (November 1 and 2).

Historically, bread in Europe and in the Christian religion was related to both the divine and death. This relationship between bread and death dates back to time immemorial, as the ancient Egyptians already prepared mortuary offerings of wheat bread.

Pan de ánimas is also known as pan bendecido ('blessed bread') or pan de caridad ('charity bread'). The tradition of the mortuary breads in Spain is collected by the anthropologist Luis de Hoyos Sainz in the publication Folklore español del culto a los muertos (1945), although he notes that these traditions have gradually ceased to be practised, first in the big cities and then in the villages. Today, the pan de ánimas has some derivatives, recipes that have been converted into sweet breads, typical of All Saints Day, such as the fogassa from Valencia or the panellets from Catalonia.

== Bread and religion ==
Bread took on special ritual importance during the religious events of Christianity, such as Lent or Holy Week. Bread in Christianity represents a symbol of fertility, especially the fermentation process. In ancient times, the reasons why the bread dough doubled in size were unknown and the phenomenon was allegorically associated with the gestation of a new life. The bread also symbolized brotherhood among Christians, and newlyweds received bread on their wedding day, as well as in many other ceremonies. Bread offerings were also associated with death, with bread being a common offering during funerals. When a loved one died, "there should be bread in the house to facilitate the passing away." Jean-François Peyron and many others European travelers who went to Spain between the fifteenth and eighteenth centuries highlight the Spanish fervor for the cult of death. The votive character of bread reaches its maximum expression during the festa di San Giuseppe in Sicily, at that time a Hispanic region, where loaves are placed on altars on March 19. In Siena, All Saints' bread is called pan co' santi, a sweet bread with raisins, walnuts, anise and vin santo, and it is also known as pan dei morti ('bread of the dead'). The European tradition reached Latin America, where different traditions of pan de ánimas were developed, such as the pan de muerto, that is placed on Mexican altars during the Day of the Dead, or the Andean tantawawas that are also made for November 2.

Pan, ofrenda divina

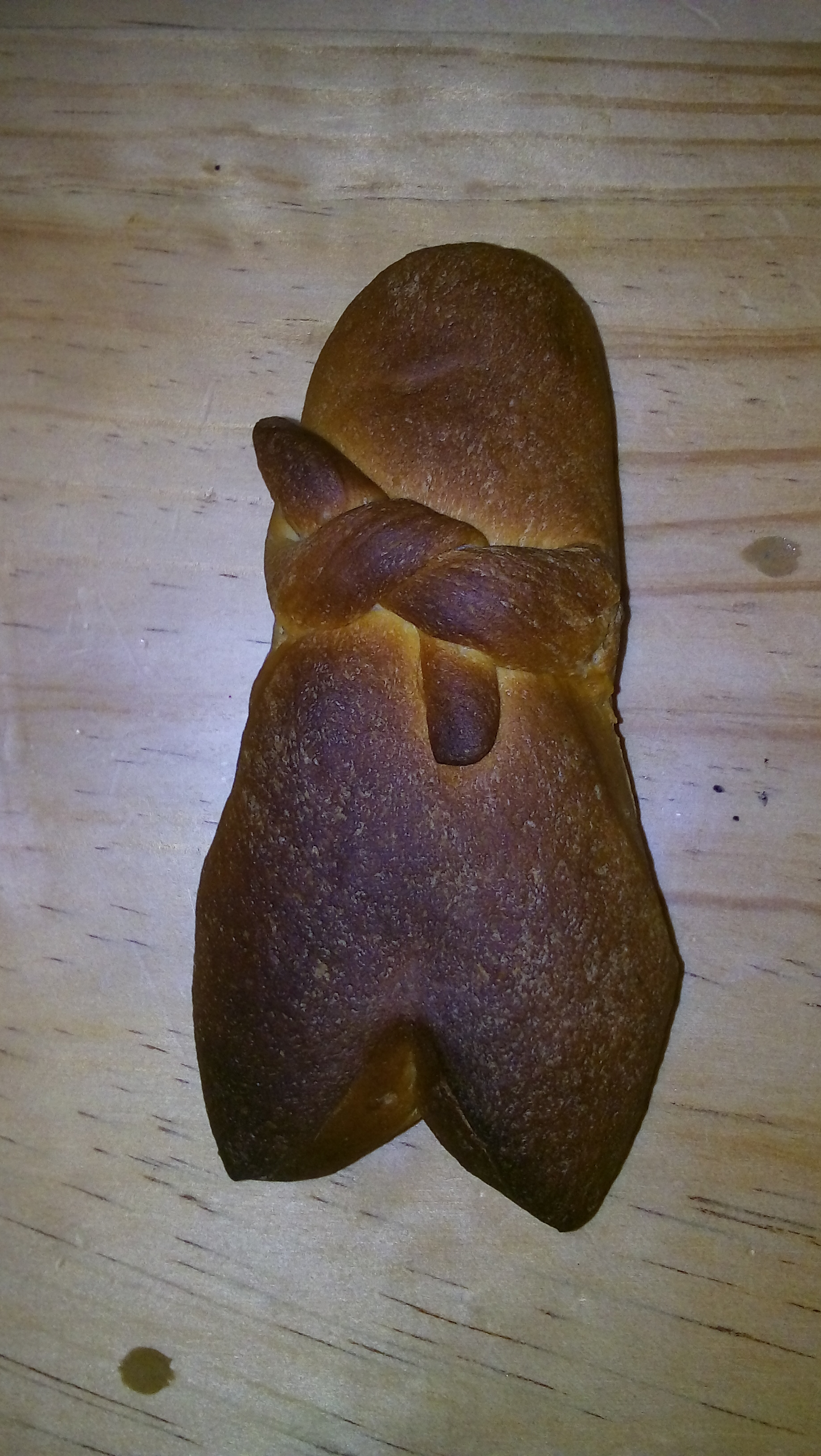
Pan de ánimas with anthropomorphic shape

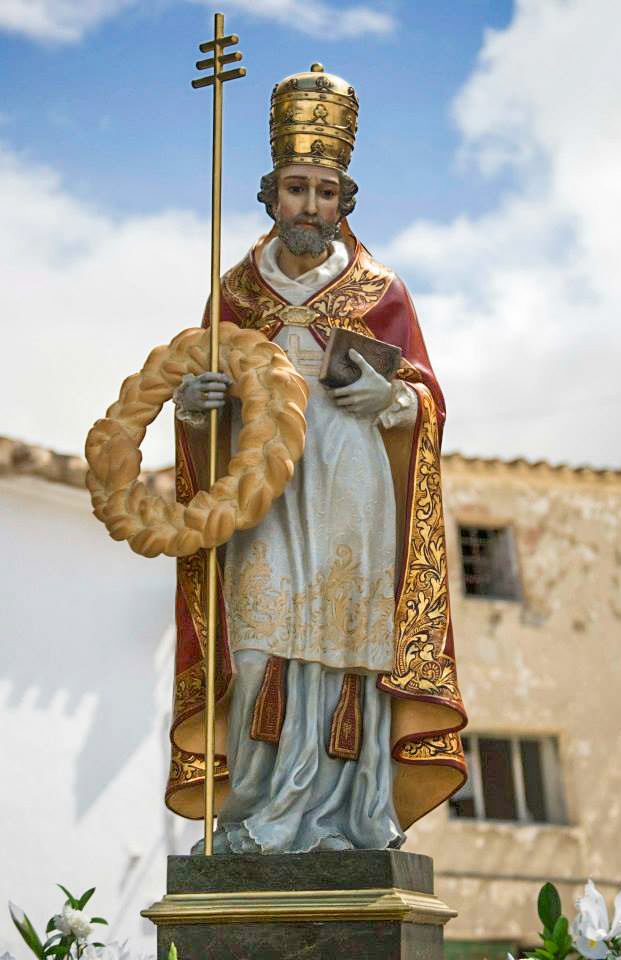
Bread bagels are offered to San León in Benamaurel

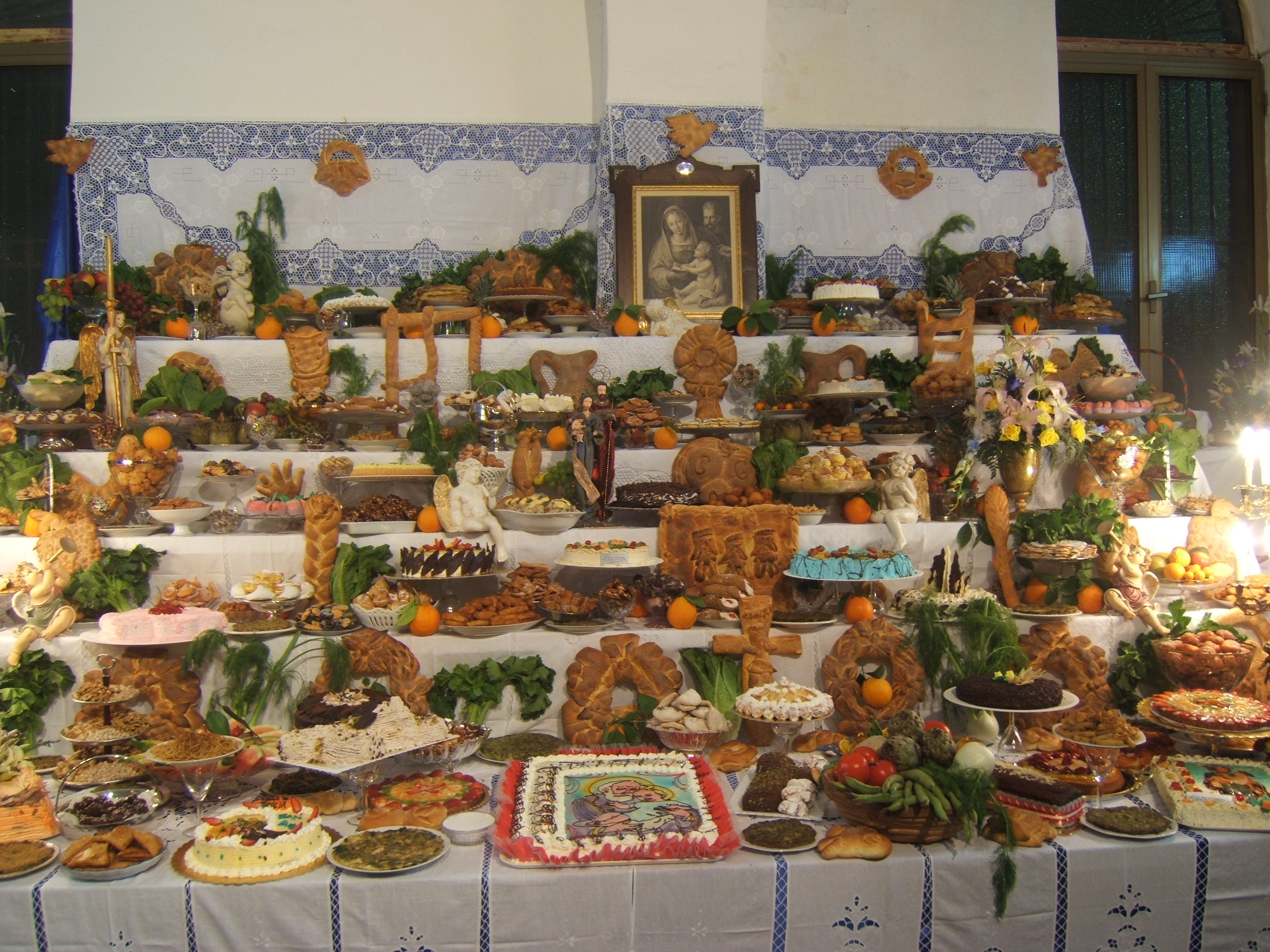
Tavolata di San Giuseppe ('St. Joseph altar') with offerings of bread in the province of Enna, Sicilia

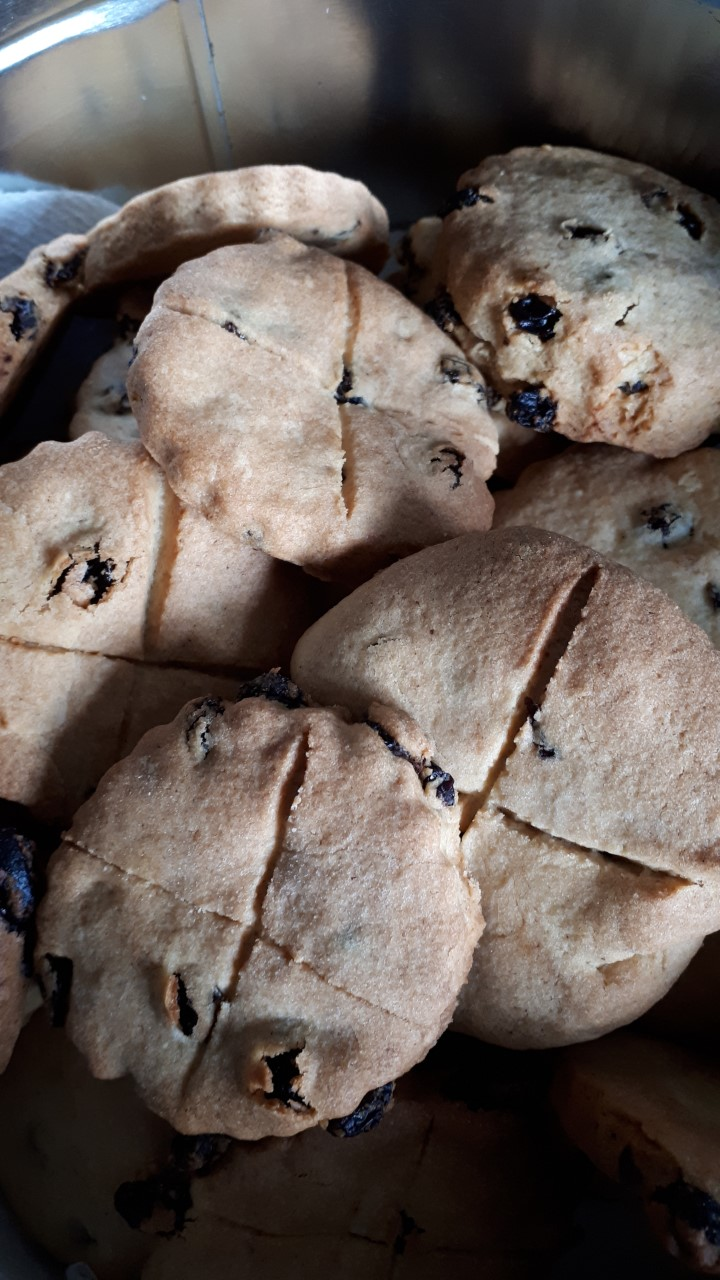
British soul cakes

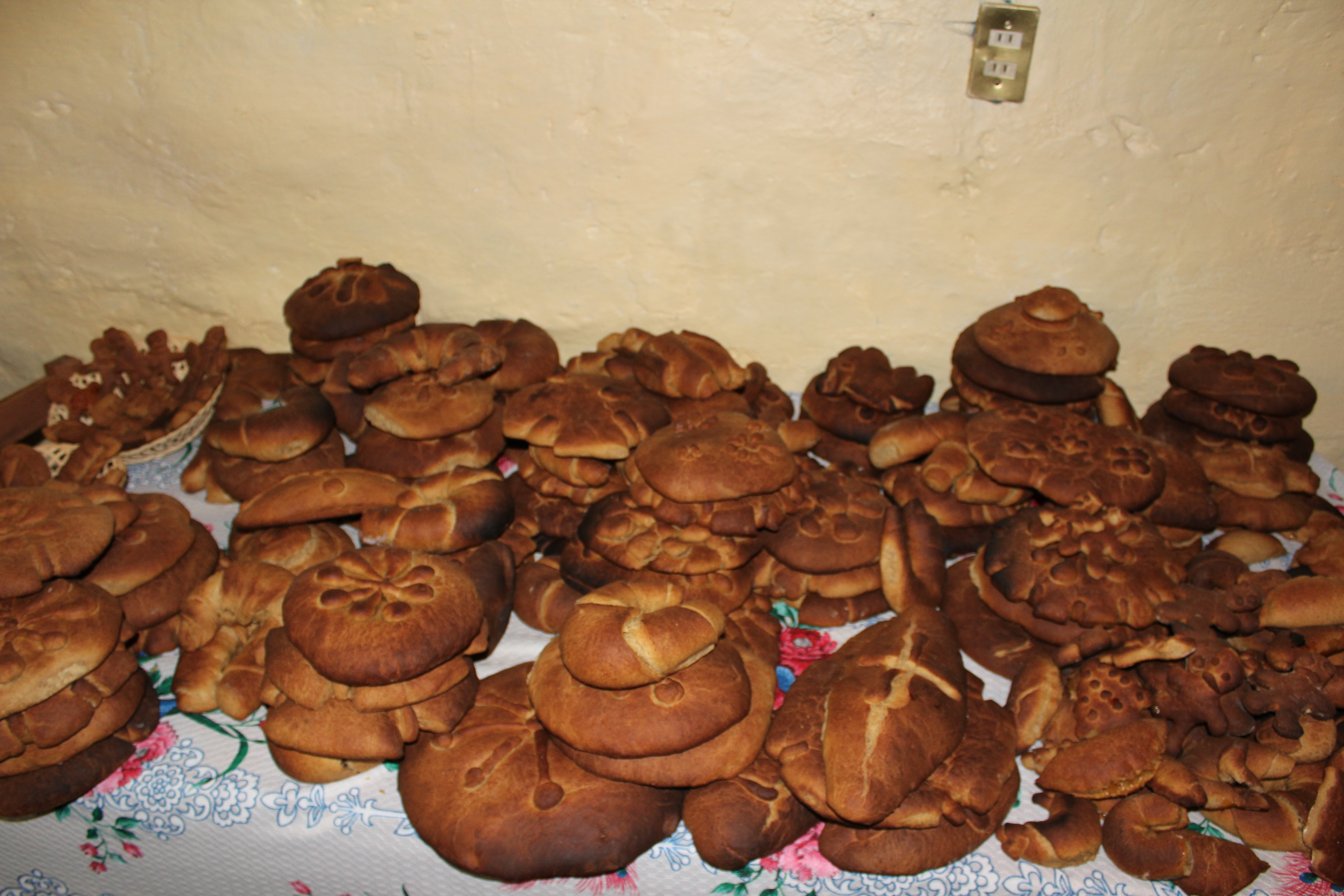
Bread of the dead in Texcoco, Mexico

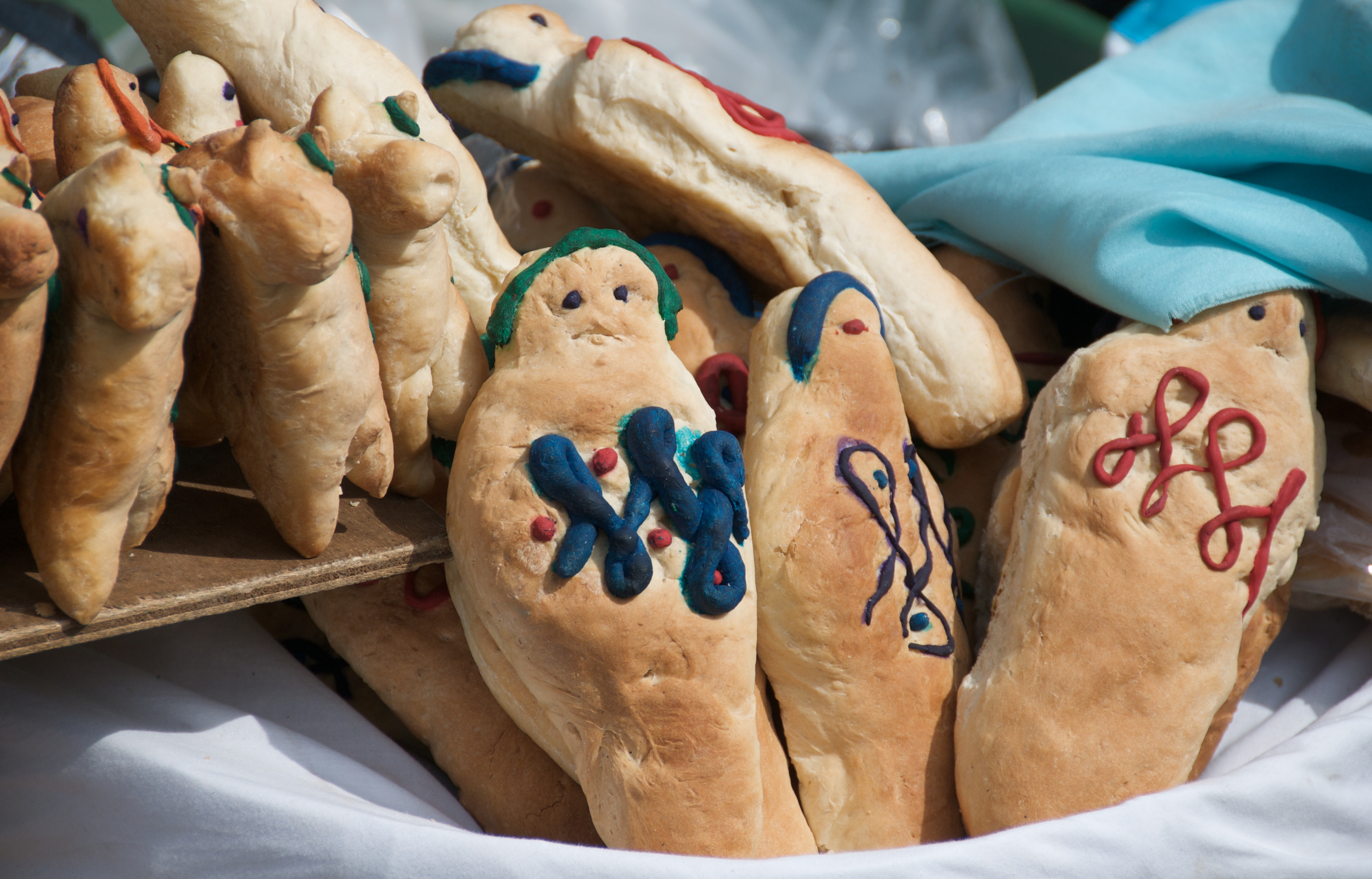
Bread guaguas in Ecuador

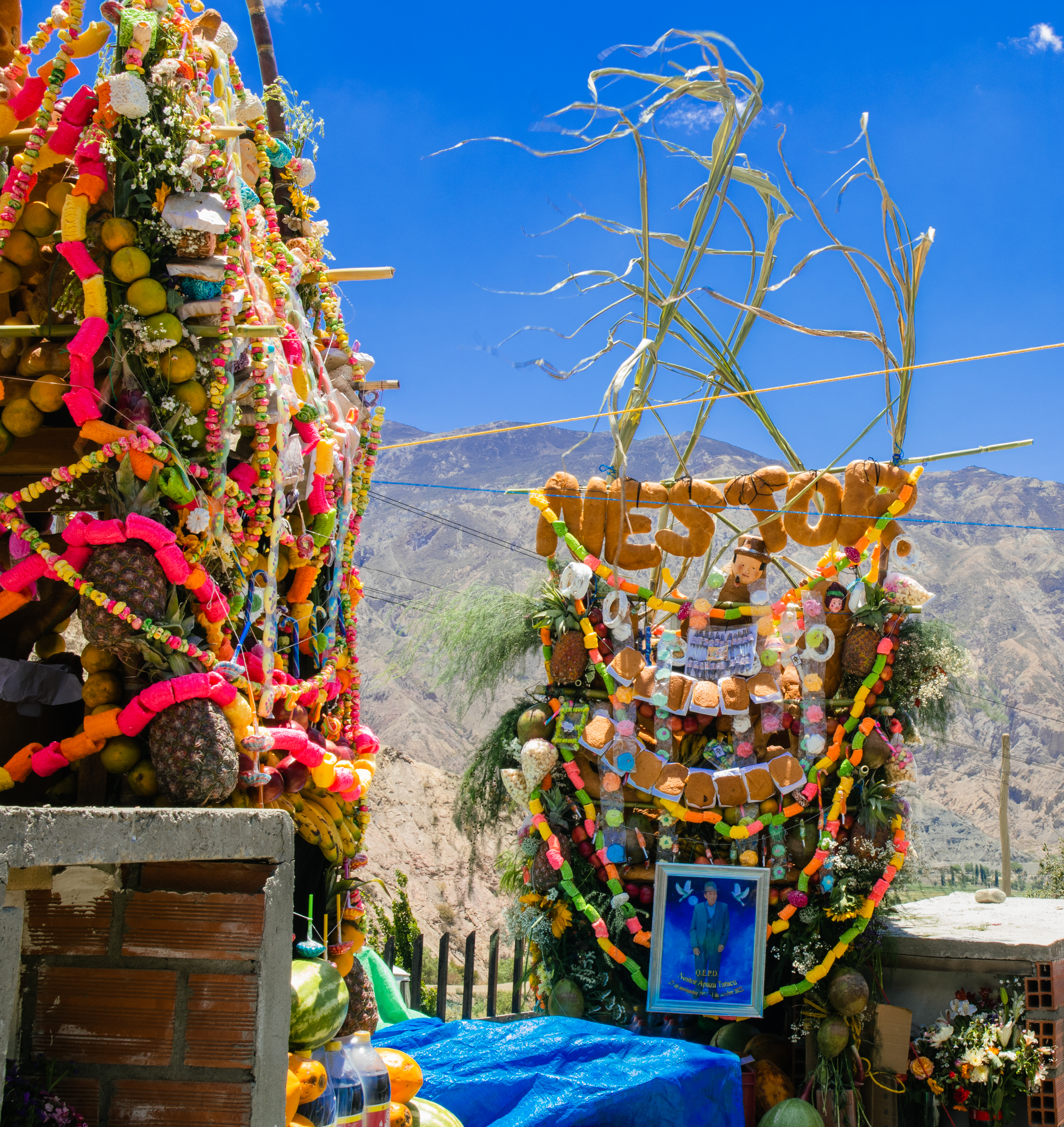
Letters of the name "Nestor" made of bread in the Palomar cemetery (La Paz Department, Bolivia).

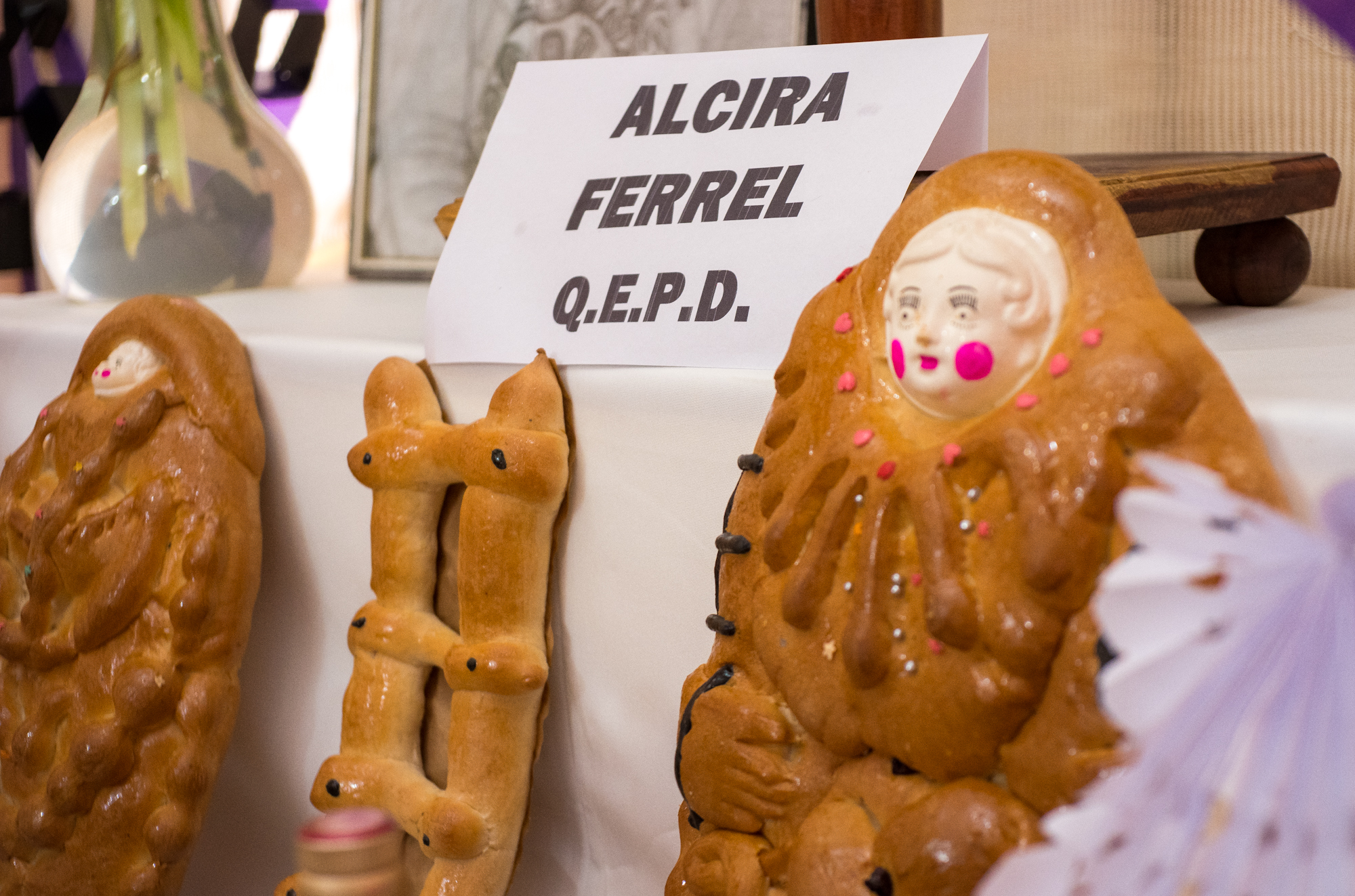
Offerings of bread to the deceased. Q.E.P.D. (Que En Paz Descanse "Rest in peace").

Currently, bread has lost the sacred and relevant character that it has historically had, and consequently the cultural practices associated with it, such as pan de ánimas, have been disappearing. The author Ibán Yarza, who toured the 50 Spanish provinces to study their local baking tradition, comments that "bread has been discredited or, rather, it has been desecrated in the sense that it was sacred because it was what was eaten the most. That is over. The religious phrase our daily bread no longer makes sense because every day less bread is eaten and every day it serves more to pair. Never has less bread been eaten than now."

== Regional culture in Spain ==
As recorded in texts (already in the 16th century), in the Iberian Peninsula it was typical to make an annual visit to the cemetery and place bread, wine and flowers on the graves. Bread was a common offering both at All Saints and at funerals in general, and especially in the north of the Iberian Peninsula. In a multitude of Galician, Cantabrian, Castilian, Aragonese and Catalan churches, the parishioners brought breads, cocas ([bread] 'cakes') and tortas (flatbreads) on All Saints' Day and gave them to the parish priest, who blessed them and then distributed them among the parishioners. Different rituals were performed with these breads depending on the place. The blessed loaves had the character of an offering, and before consuming them, an Our Father was prayed for the souls of the deceased. The offerings of bread to the dead were called robos, and are reminiscent of Roman religion. The historian Dolors Sanahuja points out that "this custom was very ancient, and miraculous properties were associated with the blessed bread". Once blessed, the pan de ánimas was distributed as alms among the poor. The sacred character of this bread made it lend itself to charity, and the Church began to tolerate mendicant rounds of food for the dead, hence the current practice of asking door to door on All Saints' Day. In the Canary Islands, a local variant is Finados, Finaos or Pan por Dios, in which children knock on their neighbors' doors asking for pan por Dios ("Bread for God") or asking ¿Hay santitos? ("Are there little saints?"), to which they received fig bread, fruit, nuts and other foods. This Canarian tradition is related to the Portuguese Paõ-por-Deus.

According to De Hoyos, these breads were made in different parts of Castile, such as in Segovia, where it was called pan de ánima, Salamanca or León, where it was called pan de muerto or pan de difunto. During the Mass of Souls in Zamora, the women who dedicated to collecting the pan de ánimas were called "animeras". In Toledo, the bread of All Saints used to have the shape of a shrouded corpse. In studies by Portuguese ethnographers such as that of Leite de Vasconcelos, the continuity of these bread offerings in the regions of Portugal is evidenced, without any variation with those of Spain. Until recently, it was typical to donate bread to Portuguese widows on All Saints' Day. In Sicily, the breads of the dead are prepared in the shape of a person with their arms crossed. In other parts of Europe, the doughs were shaped like human bones and covered with sugar.

For its part, in Galicia, the pan de difuntos was prepared with chestnut flour. The chestnut (castaña) was a typical Galician ingredient and especially the magosto (Galician name for All Saints), also known as castañada. The castañadas as "funerary food" are typical of the Leonese region, Asturias, Cantabria and Galicia, and even of Valladolid, Ávila and Extremadura. According to Hoyos Sainz, on the Cantabrian Mountains, bread and other foods were placed on the tombs of the dead on All Saints' night, which today has been replaced by flowers.

Also in Catalonia, the castanyada is typical as an autumn festival. There is evidence of the pa d'ànimes throughout Catalonia, although the traditions associated with it vary from town to town. In many, bread was offered in bowls to the dead on Sundays, or at funerals, or on special days such as November 1. Even in the past, in public ovens there was a cabinet called animer, in which all the bread was placed, which the women later gave to the souls of the deceased. The Catalan bread for the dead was also called pa d'absoltes (absoltes is the name given in Catalan to prayers dedicated to the deceased). Another Catalan mortuary bread is called pa de memòria, a loaf with a cross in the middle that was distributed to those attending a funeral after eating together. The relatives took the bread home and when they ate it, they remembered the deceased by dedicating prayers to him.

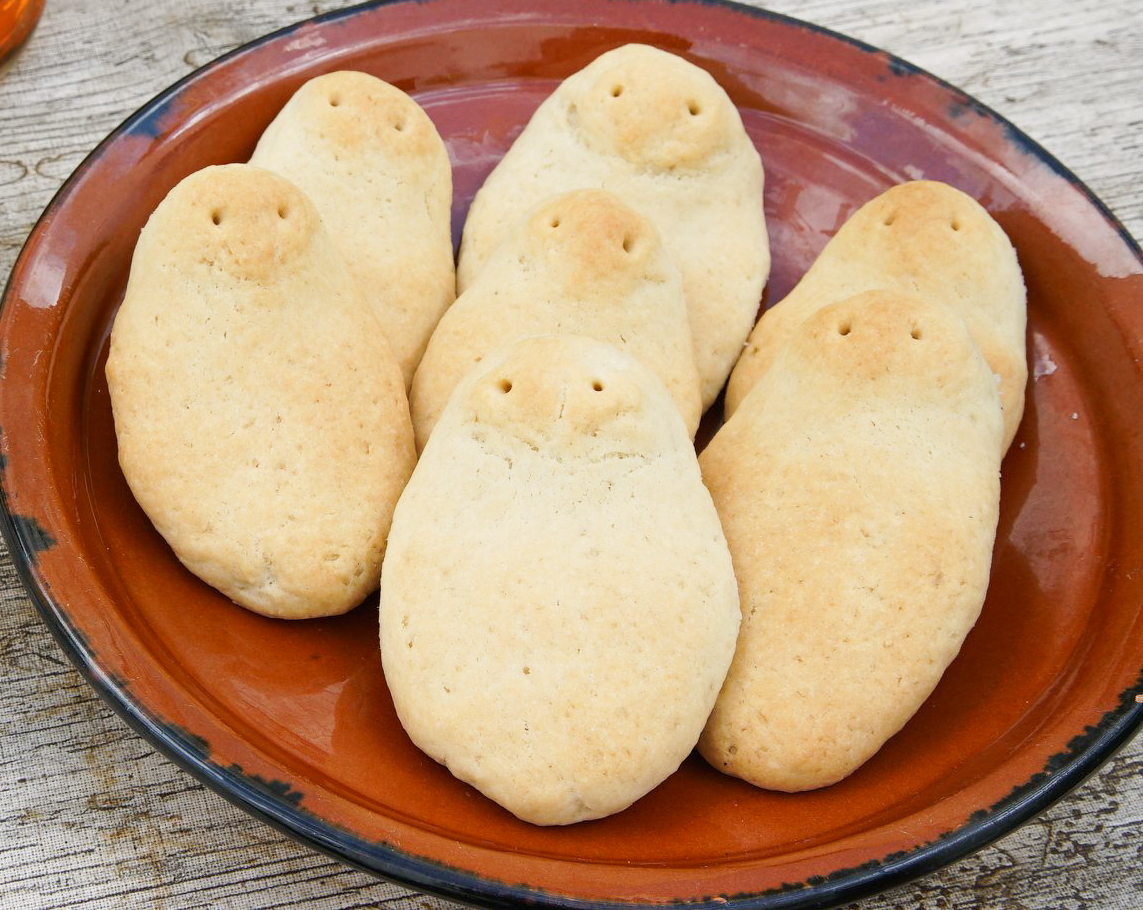
Panets de mort, an old recipe recovered by the culinary researcher Rosa Rotger, from the Spanish island of Menorca.

Once in the Balearic Islands, panets de mort were made for Tots Sants, tiny breads with anthropomorphic (dead person) or zoomorphic (rabbit) form. There is evidence of them already in the 17th century. These buns were spun on a string in the shape of a rosary and given to the children of the house to teach them the custom of praying and mourning the death of their deceased on November 1. Originally they were made with bread dough, but later it was replaced by "Royal dough" (marzipan). In the case of Menorca, the panets de mort are documented in the recipe book De re cibaria (1923), one of the most complete on island cuisine. The custom of these breads appears in the article "Costumbres Menorquinas" of the magazine Menorca Gráfica (November 13, 1927, by Miguel Vilallonga). According to it, panets the mort are typical of All Saints and All Souls' Day. Although at that time they were already considered become extinct, it indicates that it is likely that they were still made in private houses. Depending on the recipe, these breads were flavored with anise (called batalafuga in Menorcan). The recipe was recovered by the Menorcan culinary researcher Rosa Rotger.

In Valencia, the fogassa de Tots Sants is a coca (sweet flatbread) that is prepared in towns of the three provinces of the Valencian Community, and is similar to a brioche bread but whose dough includes sweet potato, nuts and sometimes anise.

== In Latin America ==
All Saints bread preparations are found in Mexico, Peru, Bolivia and Ecuador. They have also been recorded in Guatemala, Colombia and northern Argentina.

In the Andean region, the celebration of All Saints is also known as the Fiesta del Pan ("Bread Festivity"), since it is on this holiday when the most bread is produced. Among the ritual breads of Bolivia, the t'anta wawa or the potosina cake stand out. Another bread that is offered in memory of the deceased is urpu or urpi, which means 'dove' in Quechua, due to the shape it is given that represents this animal. There are also llamas, vipers, condors, etc.

In Mexico there is a wide variety of pan de muerto ("bread of the dead"), some with a human shape, others with an animal shape, although the most common is the round one with two "bones" or crossed strips of dough and sprinkled with sugar or sesame seeds, which are offering to deceased loved ones on the altar of the dead.

== See also ==
- Bread in culture
- Bread culture in Spain

== Bibliography ==
- Nicolau, Antoni; Zimmermann, Simone; Bernardette Amouretti, Marie-Claire (2001). Sacred foods: bread, wine and oil in the ancient Mediterranean (in Catalan, English, and Spanish). Barcelona: City History Museum, Institute of Culture, City Council of Barcelona. pp. 101–107. ISBN 84-932113-2-X. OCLC 48639106.
- Pan de ánimas. Ofrenda a todos os mortos: aos mortos que seguen vivos e aos vivos que existen mortos (2012). Book of poems by Xoán Abeleira Álvarez (ISBN 978-84-9914-35-14). Ed. Xerais
- Kalish, Richard (2019). Death and Dying: Views from Many Cultures. Routledge. p. 125-128. ISBN 978-1-351-84489-5.
- De Hoyos Sainz, Luis (1945). "Folklore español del culto a los muertos". Revista de dialectología y tradiciones populares. I (1, 2). Consejo Superior de Investigaciones Científicas: 30–53.
