= Soul cake =

Religious cake to commemorate the dead

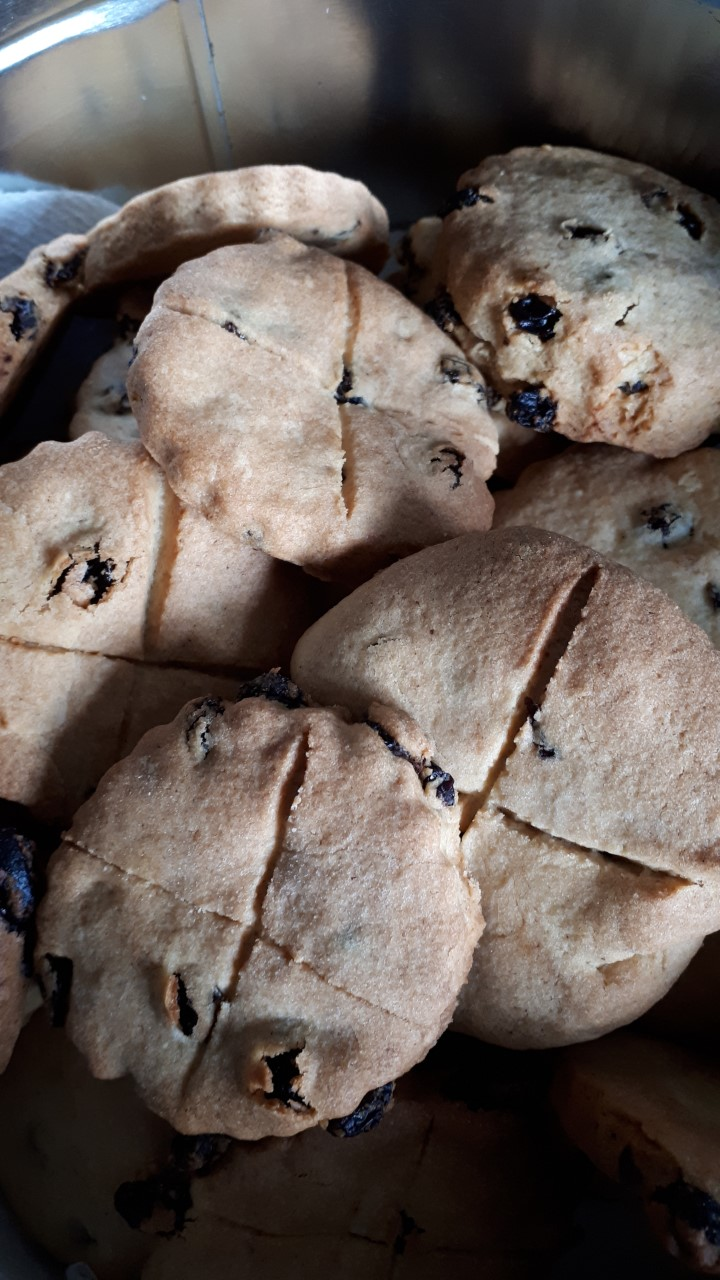
Soul cakes eaten during Halloween, All Saints' Day, and All Souls' Day

A soul cake, also known as a soulmass-cake, is a small round cake with sweet spices, which resembles a shortbread biscuit. It is traditionally made for Halloween, All Saints' Day, and All Souls' Day to commemorate the dead in many Christian traditions. The cakes, often simply referred to as souls, are given out to soulers (mainly consisting of children and the poor) who go from door to door during the days of Allhallowtide, singing and saying prayers "for the souls of the givers and their friends", especially the souls of deceased relatives, thought to be in the intermediate state between Earth and Heaven. In England, the practice dates to the medieval period, and it continued there until the 1930s by both Protestant and Catholic Christians. In Sheffield and Cheshire, the custom has continued into modern times. In Lancashire and in the North-east of England, soul cakes were known as Harcakes, a kind of thin parkin.

The practice of giving and eating soul cakes continues in some countries today, such as Portugal (where it is known as Pão-por-Deus and occurs on All Saints' Day and All Souls' Day), as well as the Philippines (where it is known as Pangangaluwa and occurs on All Hallows' Eve). In other countries, souling is seen as the origin of the practice of trick-or-treating. In the United States, some churches, during Allhallowtide, have invited people to come receive sweets from them and have offered to "pray for the souls of their friends, relatives or even pets" as they do so. Among Catholics and Lutherans, some parishioners have their soul cakes blessed by a priest before being distributed; in exchange, the children promise to pray for the souls of the deceased relatives of the giver during the month of November, which is a month dedicated especially to praying for the Holy Souls. Any leftover soul cakes are shared among the distributing family or given to the poor.

== History ==
The tradition of giving soul cakes was celebrated in Britain and Ireland during the Middle Ages, although similar practices for the souls of the dead were found as far south as Italy.

The cakes are usually filled with allspice, nutmeg, cinnamon, ginger or other sweet spices, raisins or currants, and before baking are topped with the mark of a cross to signify that these were alms. Either on All Hallows' Eve (Halloween), All Saints' Day or All Souls' Day, children would go "souling", or ritually begging for cakes door to door.

== Souling ==
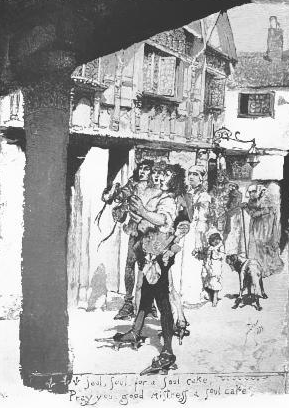
Souling was a Christian practice carried out in many English towns on Halloween and Christmas.

Souling is a Christian practice carried out during Allhallowtide and Christmastide, with origins in the medieval era. The custom was popular in England and is still practised to a minor extent in Sheffield and parts of Cheshire during Allhallowtide. The custom was also popular in Wales and has counterparts in Portugal and the Philippines (a former Spanish colony) that are practiced to this day.

According to Morton (2013), souling was once performed throughout the British Isles and the earliest activity was reported in 1511, and Shakespeare mentioned "pulling like a beggar at Hallowmas" in The Two Gentlemen of Verona (1593). However, by the end of the 19th century, the extent of the practice during Allhallowtide was limited to parts of England and Wales.

=== England ===
Souling is an English festival. According to Gregory (2010), souling involved a group of people visiting local farms and cottages. The merrymakers would sing a "traditional request for apples, ale, and soul cakes." The songs were traditionally known as souler's songs and were sung in a lamenting tone during the 1800s. Sometimes adult soulers would use a musical instrument, such as a concertina. In 1899, a version was sung by boys in Harrogate, Yorkshire, who were "running beside carriage, begging".

Rogers (2003) believes souling was traditionally practised in the North and West of England, in the counties of Yorkshire, Lancashire, Cheshire, Staffordshire, the Peak District area of Derbyshire, Somerset and Herefordshire. Palmer (1976) states that souling took place on All Saints day in Warwickshire. However, Hutton (2001) believes souling took place in Hertfordshire.

The custom of souling ceased relatively early in Warwickshire but the dole instituted by John Collet in Solihull (now within West Midlands) in 1565 was still being distributed in 1826 on All Souls day. The announcement for collection was made by ringing church bells. Further, soul-cakes were still made in Warwickshire (and other parts of Yorkshire) even though no one visited for them.

According to Brown (1992) souling was performed in Birmingham and parts of the West Midlands; and according to Raven (1965) the tradition was also kept in parts of the Black Country. The prevalence of souling was so localised in some parts of Staffordshire that it was observed in Penn but not in Bilston, both localities now in modern Wolverhampton. In Staffordshire, the "custom of souling was kept on All Saints' Eve" (Halloween).

Similarly in Shropshire, during the late 19th century, "there was set upon the board at All Hallows Eve a high heap of Soul-cakes" for visitors to take. The songs sung by people in Oswestry (Shropshire), which borders Wales, contained some Welsh.

==== Traditions ====
The customs associated with souling during Allhallowtide include or included consuming and/or distributing soul cakes, singing, carrying lanterns, dressing in disguise, bonfires, playing divination games, carrying a horse's head and performing plays.

==== Cakes ====
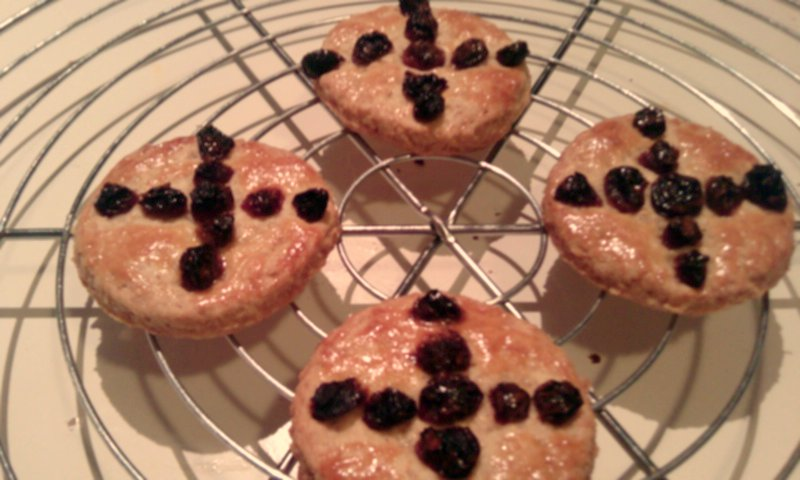
Soul cakes

Soul cakes formed a key part of the souling traditions. In Staffordshire, the cakes were also called Soul-mass or somas cakes. In East Yorkshire, saumas loaves were traditionally distributed, and a recipient was to keep one cake in their home throughout the following year for good luck. In some counties, the Soul-mass cake was "made on All Souls' Day, November 2nd, and always in a triangular shape". Soul-mass cakes were often kept for good luck with one lady in Whitby being reported in the 1860s having a soul-mass loaf one hundred years old. According to Atkinson (1868), soul-mass loaves "were sets of square farthing cakes with currants in the centre, commonly given by bakers to their customers". Sometimes, oat cakes were given in Lancashire and Herefordshire. In Warwickshire, during the 1840s, it was traditional to consume seed cakes during Halloween which coincided with "the end of the wheat seed-time".

===== Lanterns and disguise =====
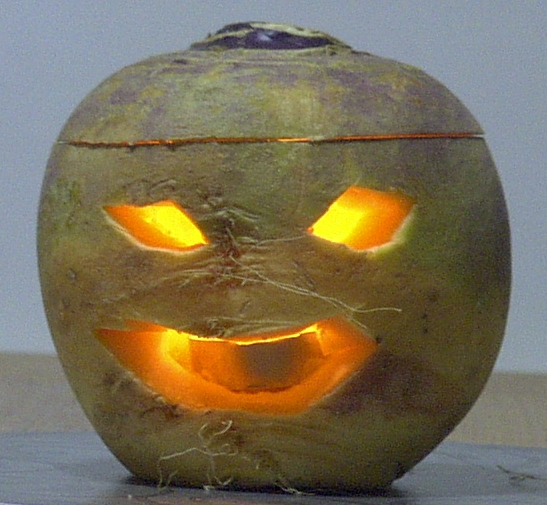
Turnip lantern

The traditions associated with souling included soulers visiting houses with "hollowed-out turnip lanterns" with a candle inside which represented a soul trapped in purgatory. Smith (1989) notes that in parts of Yorkshire, "children still appear on door steps with turnip lanterns and disguised as witches, ghosts and skeletons". In Northern England, people sometimes went souling in disguise wearing long black cloaks. At times, children went out souling in disguise. According to the Folk-lore Society publication of 1940, children went souling in costume. Such masquerading in costume was either a tribute to saints or imitated spirits.

===== Bonfires and candles =====
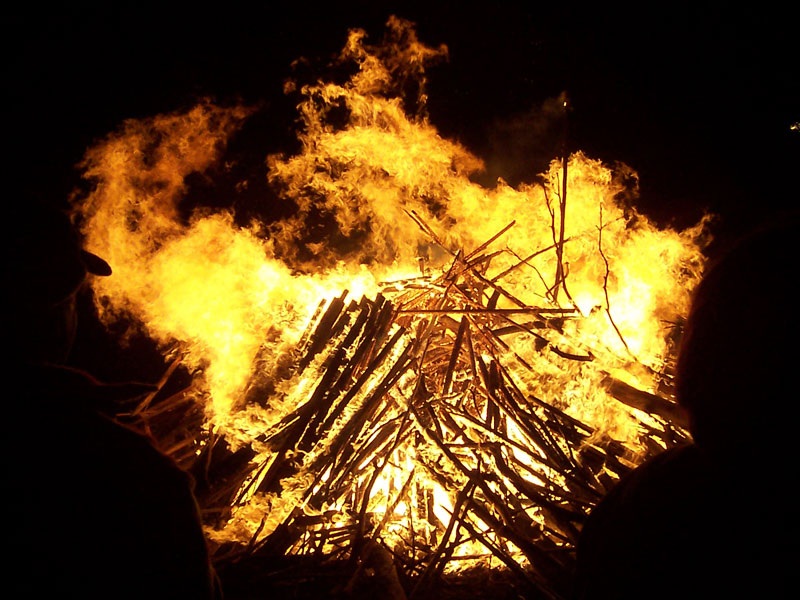
Bonfire

Bonfires were also lit on Halloween and during Hallowtide which Roud (2008) suggests may be related to the purgation of souls by holy fire. Fires known as Tindle fires were made by children on All Souls' night in Derbyshire. In Lancashire, bonfires were lit on Halloween which were known as Teanlay fires which were lit on many hills to observe the fast (feast) of All Souls and the night was called Teanlay Night (after which the Teanlowe Shopping Centre is named in Poulton-le-Fylde).

According to Hardwick (1872), the burning of fires on Halloween may also be related to earlier practices. In the English countryside, people lit bonfires to ward off evil spirits. Glassie (1969) believes that fires on Halloween were lit into modern times in the Celtic areas of "northern and westernmost counties of England". During the 1850s, in Carleton, Lancashire, fires were lit to "defend the corn from darnel".

As an alternative to bonfires, in Lancashire, candles were carried between 11:00 p.m. and midnight on Halloween in a procession up the hills in a custom known as 'lating the witches'. If the candles continuously burnt then the witches' powers would not affect the candle holder as "it was firmly believed in Lancashire that the witches assembled on this night at their general rendezvous in the Forest of Pendle" which relates to the 17th century Pendle witches. East of Pendle, candles were lit in every window an hour before midnight; if the candle burnt out before midnight, it was believed evil would follow. According to Frazer (1935) at Longridge Fell, during the early part of the 19th century, "parties went from house to house in the evening collecting candles, one for each inmate, and offering their services to late or leet the witches". Hampson (1841) notes that the words lating and leeting are derived from the Saxon word leoht, meaning "light."

===== Divination games =====
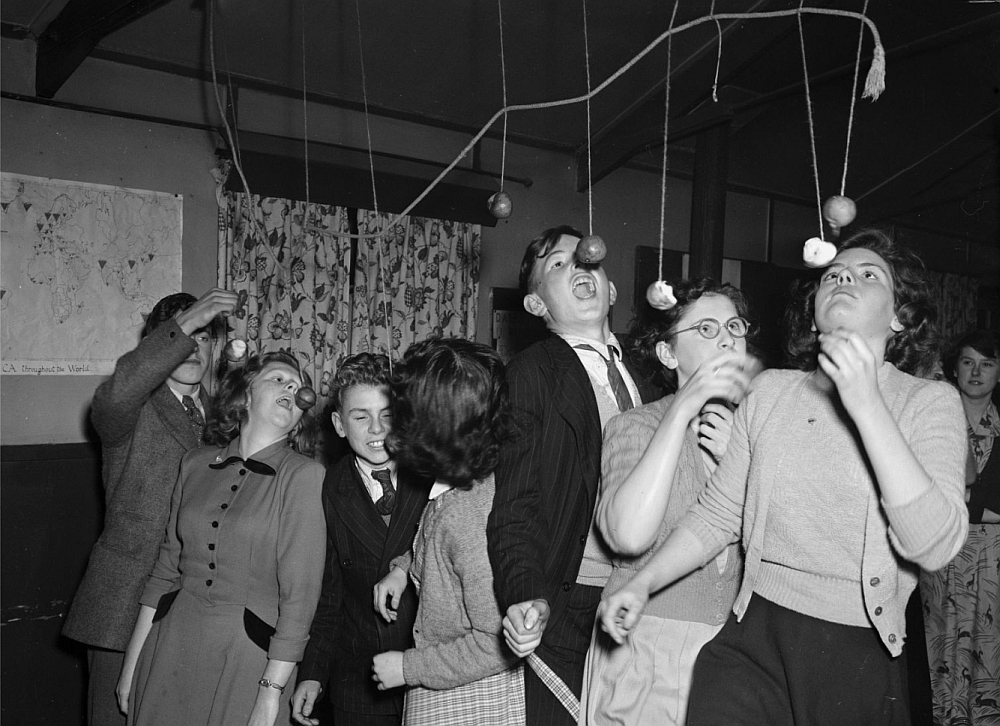
Apple-bobbing at Ditherington Hallowe'en party (1950)

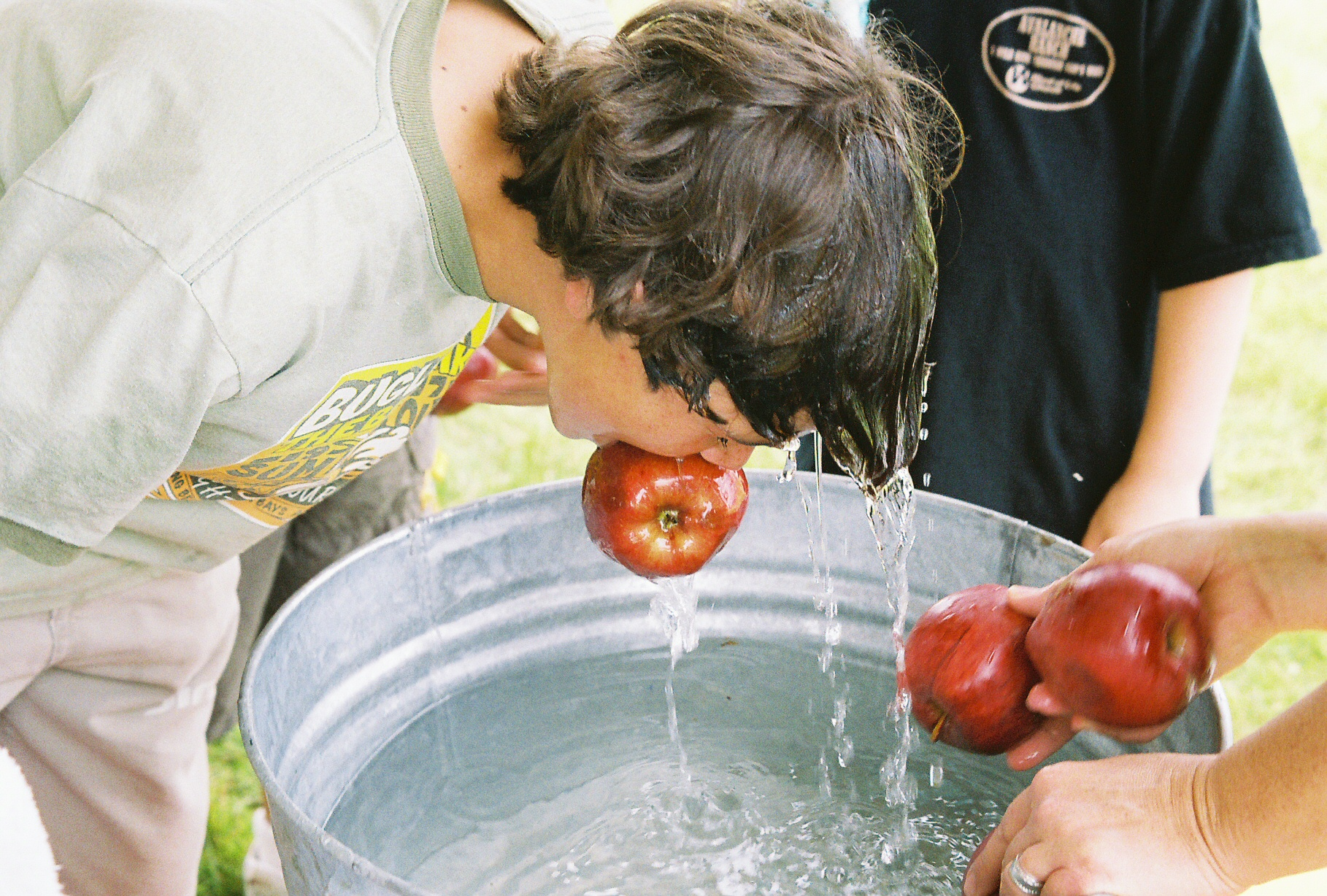
Apple bobbing

Glassie (1969) suggests that long after 1 November was dedicated to All Saints' Day, a Christian festival, people still continued to practice older pagan beliefs, such as playing divination games on All Saints' evening. The Chambers's Encyclopædia (1871) states that on Halloween in England, "it was long customary to crack nuts, duck for apples in a tub of water, and perform other harmless fireside revelries". According to Green (1859), "in some parts of England, the Souling Customs have nuts connected with them, and All Souls' Eve is then named, Nut-crack Night". Such games were also played on Halloween leading to Halloween being known as nut-crack night in the north of England.

Another game involved the use of apples, and in some parts of England, Halloween was known as Snap-Apple Night. In Staffordshire, one form of the game involved suspending a string from the ceiling and attaching an apple at the end. The apple was then swung in a pendulum motion. The players would need to bite the apple with their hands behind their backs. At Knowle near Solihull, the winner of a game of apple bobbing peeled the apple and "threw the parings over her shoulder. The shape of the peel on the ground could indicate the initials of a future spouse". Apple bobbing is still played on Halloween. According to Green (1980), "apples turn up in Hallowe'en games as an indication of immortality for you are trying to seize the magic fruit from under water, or from a string hung from the ceiling, as if you were snatching a fragment of life from the darkness".

Playing divination games with apples was also popular on other days dedicated to saints, such as St Clement's Day on 23 November, which was known as Bite-Apple night, in places such as Wednesbury (Sandwell) and Bilston (Wolverhampton) when people went Clementing in a similar manner to souling. The Clementing custom was also observed in Aston, Sutton Coldfield, Curdworth, Minworth and Kingsbury. During the 19th century, St. Clement was a popular saint in West Bromwich and during the 1850s, children and others in neighbouring Oldbury also begged for apples on St. Clement's day and money on St. Thomas's day, which takes place on 21 December. In Walsall, apples and nuts were provided by the local council on St. Clement's day.

===== Old Hob =====
In some parts of Cheshire during the 19th century, adults and children went souling performing plays and carrying an Old Hob which consisted of a horse's head enveloped in a sheet. The head would be put on a pole and sometimes, a candle would be lit inside, in which case the pole bearer would be covered in a sheet. During the early 1900s, men in Warburton went out on All Saints day with lanterns at night with one of the men wearing a horse's skull called the "Old Warb" and visited farmer's houses for drink and money. Barber (1910) believes the use of an imitation of a horse's head by soulers resulted in souling "being grafted on to the pagan custom of 'hodening'".

==== Modern observances ====
By the latter half of the 19th century, states Simpson (1976), it was more usual for children to go out souling. Further, by the 19th century, memories of begging for bread "for the sake of souls departed" had faded, "leaving only the name soul-cake".

The educational reforms of 1870 meant that children, other than very small children, went to school which was when souling would be carried by children and this affected the extent of the practice. However, the custom persisted in "rural Cheshire, northern Shropshire and adjoining part of Staffordshire" up to the 1950s. Hole (1975) noted in her book "English Traditional Customs" that "in Cheshire and Shropshire, small bands of children still go Souling through the villages on All Souls' Day (or on All Saints' Day which is its Eve). They visit the houses and sing one or other of the traditional Souling-songs, and are then rewarded with gifts of money, or cakes, or sweets". Simpson (1976) also states that in some villages in Cheshire, children have maintained the Souling tradition and go out Souling either on Halloween or the first two days of November.

===== Caking night =====
Hutton (2001) believes souling is being observed in modern times in Sheffield. The custom on the outskirts of Sheffield is known as caking-night and traditionally took take place either on 30/31 October or 1/2 November where children "said the traditional caking rhyme ("Cake, cake, copper, copper"), and received about ten pence from each householder" as reported in Lore and Language, Volume 3, Issues 6–10 in 1982. Prior to the Second World War, children in Dungworth, South Yorkshire, went 'caking' wearing masks and visiting houses in the village, "asking the householder to guess their identity". According to Sykes (1977), caking night is also known as caking neet which traditionally takes place on 1 November, or the first Monday if the first falls on a Saturday or a Sunday. According to Chainey (2018), soul-caking is still very popular in Cheshire.

===== Souling plays =====
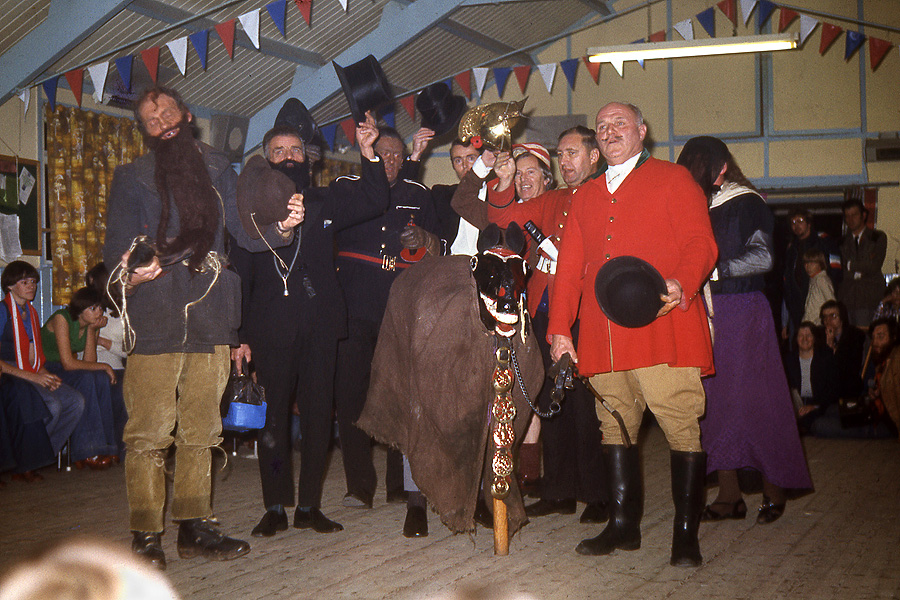
Antrobus Soul Cakers (Cheshire)

In the county of Cheshire, souling plays were traditionally performed. This involved groups of soulers visiting farmhouses performing a death and resurrection play. One of the members would wear a horse-skull without which the play could not be performed. According to Whitmore (2010), the plays were presided by Beelzebub (the Devil) and if two soulers' gangs met, they had to fight and smash the losers' horse skull. A link between souling and the deceased was made by Wilfred Isherwood, leader of the Antrobus cast, when he said in 1954 that they believed in souling and ghosts.

Souling plays still take place in Cheshire where groups such as the Jones' Ale Soul Cakers perform annually. The villages of Antrobus and Comberbach are also noted for souling plays in Cheshire.

The Antrobus’ troop perform annually in pubs around Cheshire between 31 October and 12 November. The characters include the Letter-in, Black Prince, King George, the Quack Doctor, and ‘Dick’ the Wild Horse and his Driver. The characters are believed to represent the souls of the dead.

===== Mischief Night =====
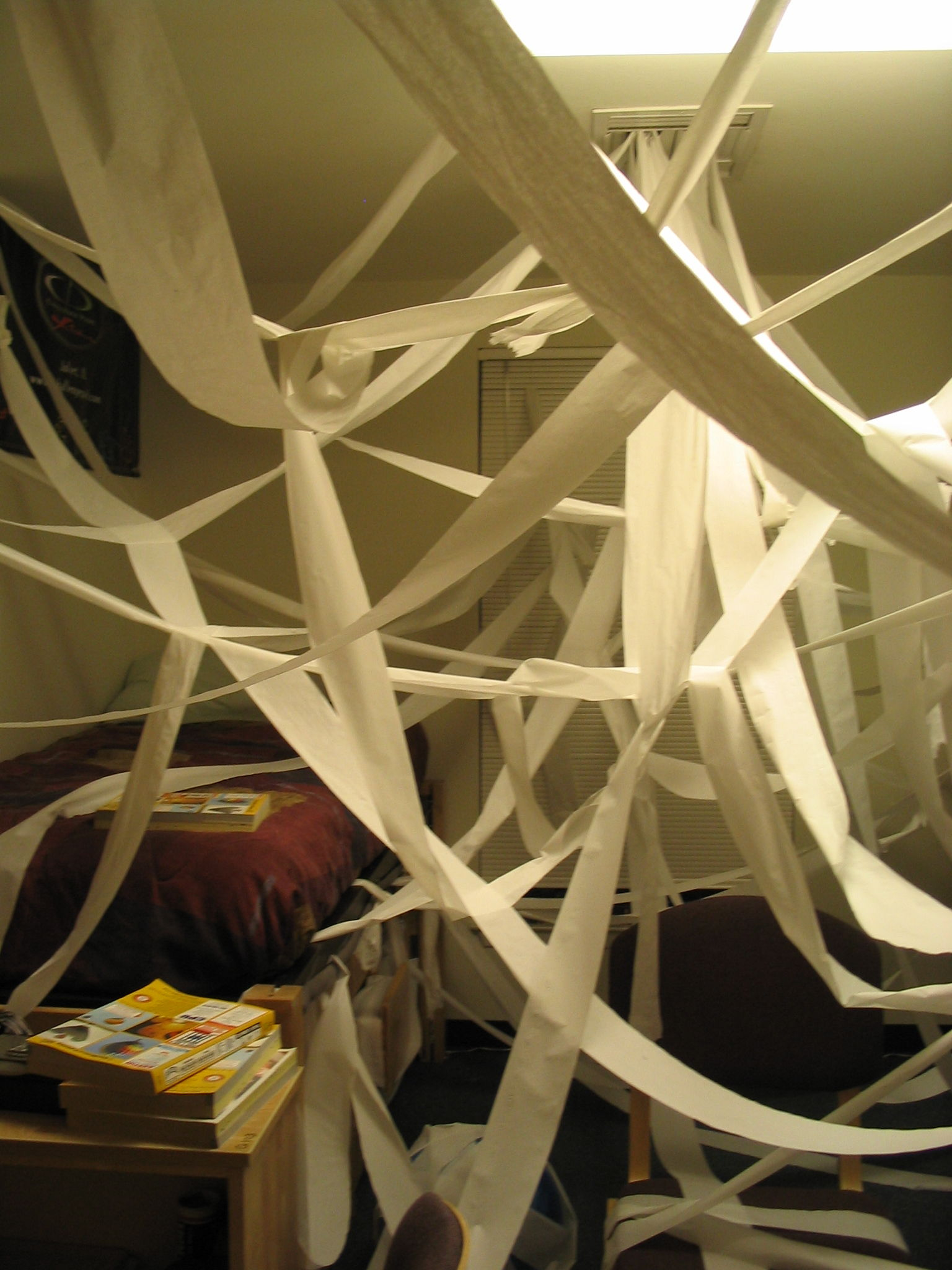
Toilet paper prank

In Lancashire, the evening before Halloween is known as Mischief Night. According to Sommerlad (2018), Mischief Night is "known by different dialect names from one region to another – "Mizzy Night" in Liverpool, "Chievous Night" in Yorkshire – the occasion has been likened to a coming of age ritual for teenagers, emboldened to throw eggs, stick chewing gum into the locks of car doors and deck neighbours’ trees in rolls of toilet paper. The seasonal availability of fireworks also provides a popular addition to the arsenal". According to Roud (2010), Mischief Night "has proved a very strong pull in places like Liverpool" on 30 October, the eve of Halloween.

=== Wales ===
Rogers (2003) believes souling took place in Monmouth and Caernarfonshire in Wales. According to Ross (2001), in many parts of Wales, up to the eighteenth century, the souling ceremony involved lighting candles in the parish Church. Parishioners donated the candles and "when they were lit, the way in which the flame burned, faintly or brightly, would serve as a prognosis of the future". The ceremony also involved preparing sole cakes which were known as pice rhanna. Sometimes, during the 19th century, upon receiving the soul cakes, people would "pray to God to bless the next crop of wheat".

Souling was known as hel solod and hel bwyd cennady meirw, "collecting the food of the messenger of the dead". This custom took place in many parts of Wales on All Souls' Eve. In 1823, it was noted that there was a tradition in Wales for the messenger, known as cennad ymeirw, to knock on doors and say "Deca, Deca, dowch i'r drws, a rhowch ... igennady meirw". [Deca, Deca, come to the door... and give to the messenger of death]. If nothing was received, the response would be "Deca, Deca, o dan y drws, a phen, y wraig yn siwtrws" [Deca, Deca, under the door, and the wife's head in smithereens]. Food known as Bwyd Cennad y Meirw was also left outside and the hearth was prepared at night for the arrival of the dead relatives. According to Ellwood (1977), doors were left unbolted. Children went out on All Saints' day too in Denbighshire and Merionethshire asking for Bwyd Cennad y Meirw in the late 1800s. People in North Wales also distributed soul-cakes on All Souls' Day and lit a great fire called Coel Coeth on All Saints' Eve "when every family about an hour in the night" made a great fire near their house.

In Pembrokeshire, people went souling for bread and cheese. In Gower, the dish associated with All Souls' day is souly cake, which is a fruit and spice bun. According to Duncan (2010), bakers gave souly cakes (small loaves) to their customers which were kept by them in their homes to bring good luck. Such cakes, according to Duncan, are still baked in Wales.

=== Songs ===
The English "Souling Song" is categorised as number 304 in the Roud Folk Song Index. The song varies from place to place, and is also known as "Catherning", "Stafford Begging Song" and "Caking Song".

Historian George Ormerod collected a version entitled "Souling Song" in Chester and published it in his 1819 book History of the County Palatine and City of Chester. A version collected in 1818 in Staffordshire entitled "Soul Cakes" and beginning "Soul, soul, for an apple or two" was published and discussed in Aris's Birmingham Gazette in 1858. A fragmented version beginning with 'One for Peter, two for Paul' was collected in Shrewsbury, Shropshire, and printed in a newspaper in 1856. In the 1880s, author and folklorist Charlotte Sophia Burn collected several versions from Staffordshire.

In 1891, Rev. M. P. Holme of Tattenhall, Cheshire, collected the song traditionally sung during souling, from a little girl at the local school. Two years later, the text and tune were published by folklorist Lucy Broadwood, who commented that souling was still practised at that time in Cheshire and Shropshire. A version was called 'Stafford Begging Song' was collected in Staffordshire in 1907, and further recordings of the traditional soul-cake song were collected in various parts of England until the 1950s. Folklorist Peter Kennedy made audio recordings of two traditional versions in the 1950s in Cheshire. Versions collected any later than this may have been influenced by folk revival recordings of the song by such groups as Peter, Paul and Mary and The Watersons.

The 1891 Cheshire version contains a chorus and three verses:

[Chorus]
A soul! a soul! a soul-cake!
Please good Missis, a soul-cake!
An apple, a pear, a plum, or a cherry,
Any good thing to make us all merry.
One for Peter, two for Paul
Three for Him who made us all.

[Verse 1]
God bless the master of this house,
The misteress also,
And all the little children
That round your table grow.
Likewise young men and maidens,
Your cattle and your store;
And all that dwells within your gates,
We wish you ten times more.

[Verse 2]
Down into the cellar,
And see what you can find,
If the barrels are not empty,
We hope you will prove kind.
We hope you will prove kind,
With your apples and strong beer,
And we'll come no more a-souling
Till this time next year.

[Verse 3]
The lanes are very dirty,
My shoes are very thin,
I've got a little pocket
To put a penny in.
If you haven't got a penny,
A ha'penny will do;
If you haven't get a ha'penny,
It's God bless you

In 1963, the American folk group Peter, Paul and Mary recorded this 1891 Cheshire version published by Lucy Broadwood as "A' Soalin", including all the verses as well as parts of "Hey, Ho, Nobody Home" and "God Rest You Merry, Gentlemen" (which are traditionally associated with Christmas). The musical arrangement (including the accompaniment, chords, and interpolations from the other traditional songs) is quite different from the published 1893 version and was copyrighted by members of the group.

American Hallowe'en composer Kristen Lawrence found two historical tunes associated with soul cakes as she was researching souling songs for her 2009 A Broom With A View album. As Lawrence heard the traditional Cheshire tune, she was struck that the beginning notes were the same as the mediaeval plainchant Dies Irae, "Day of Judgment", calling the people to repent and pray for the dead. It seemed plausible that the Cheshire tune could be a folk corruption of the chant as children and beggars asked for cakes in return for praying for the dead.

The song "Soul Cake" from British rock musician Sting's 2009 album If on a Winter's Night... seems to be an adaptation of the Peter, Paul, and Mary version, in that both depart from historical accuracy by referring to Christmas rather than All Saints' Day or All Souls' Day. But the 1893 version of the song already shares lines from similar Christmas carols: "Here We Come A-Wassailing" and "Christmas is A-Coming".

=== Philippines and Portugal ===
In the Philippines, the practice of souling is called Pangangaluwa and is practiced on All Hallow's Eve among children in rural areas. People drape themselves in white cloths to represent souls and then visit houses, where they sing in return for prayers and sweets.

In Portugal, groups of children go souling on All Hallow's Day, collecting Pão-por-Deus (bread for God's sake) from their neighbours.

== See also ==
- Hot cross bun
- Pan de ánimas
- Festival of the Dead
