= Kristen Lawrence =

American musical artist

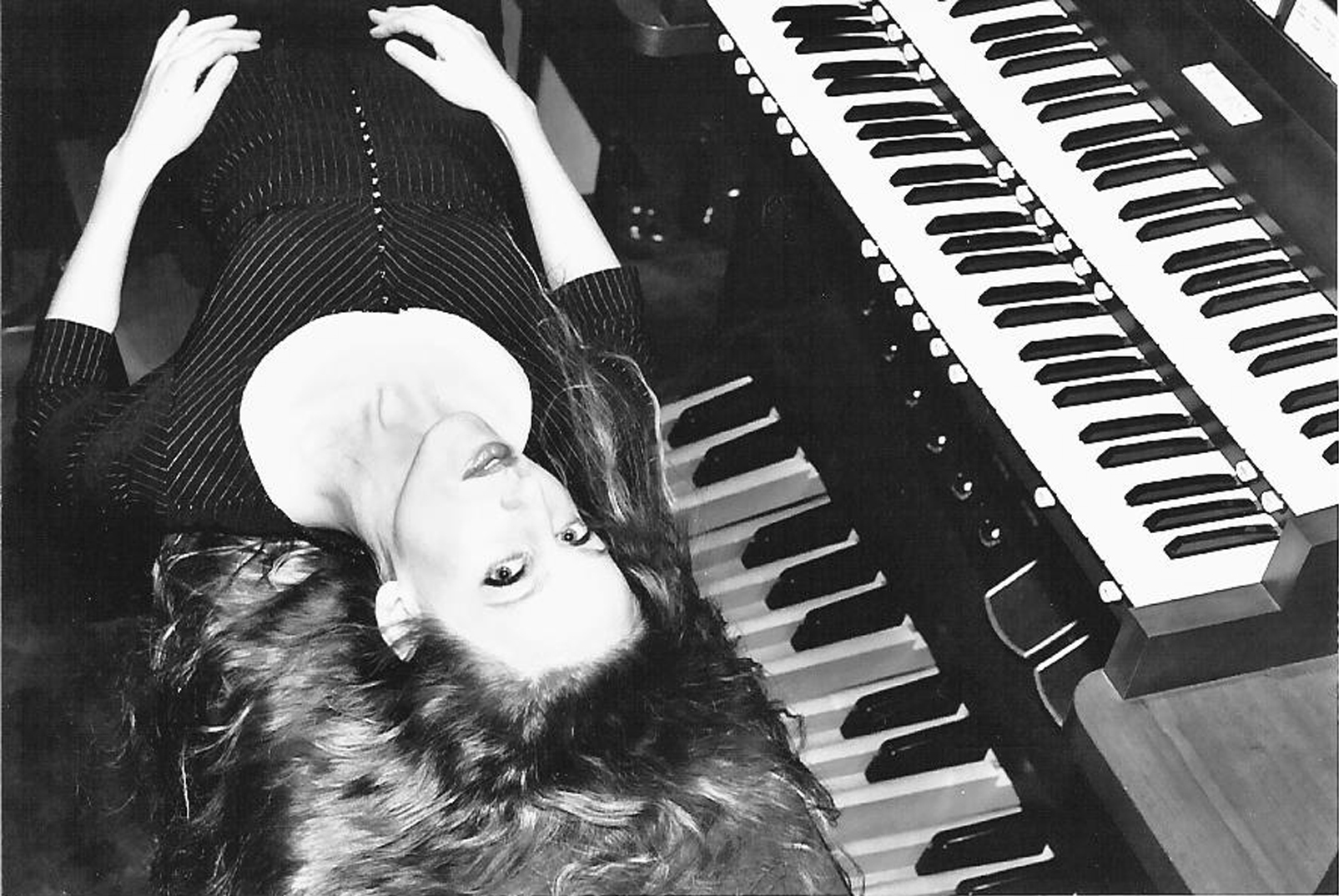
- Kristen Lawrence

Background information
- Birth name: Kristen Elise Lawrence
- Origin: Orange County, California, United States
- Genres: Rock, art rock, classical, gothic rock, folk metal, piano rock, organ rock
- Occupation(s): Organist, composer, singer, arranger, lyricist
- Instrument(s): Pipe organ, piano, harpsichord, keyboard, vocals
- Years active: 1988–present
- Labels: Vörswell Music
- Website: www.halloweencarols.com

Kristen Elise Lawrence (born March 2, 1976) is an American organist, composer, and vocalist who writes, produces, records, and performs her music based on Halloween history. She graduated from Brigham Young University in 2001 with a Bachelor of Music in organ performance and pedagogy.

In 2009, Lawrence released her album Broom With a View, a 13-track of songs celebrating Halloween. In addition to her original compositions, Lawrence researches traditional folk songs and arranges them for organ. The songs are largely based on the older roots of Halloween traditions, from pagan ceremonies to the Christian traditions that eventually melded with them.

== Discography ==
=== Albums ===
- Arachnitect (2008)
- A Broom with a View (2009)
- Vampire Empire (2009)
- Edgar Allan Poe's "The Raven" (2012)
- Hallowe'en: Night of Spirits" (2018)

=== Singles ===
- Zombie Ambience (2015)
- Zombie Ambience ("Zombies Around Steve Bartek" Version) (2015)
- Zombie Ambience ("Quick Bite" Radio Edit) (2015)
- Gust ("Ghost Town" Version) (2015)
- Gust ("Crossroads" Version) (2015)
- Witch of the Salem Town (2019)
- Sleepy Hollow: Love is Scary (2020)
- Garden of Magic (Come, Little Children) [Witches and Faeries Version] (2021)
- Garden of Magic (Come, Little Children) [Instrumental Witches and Faeries Version] (2022)
