= Pão por Deus =

Portuguese soul cake tradition

Pão-por-Deus (Portuguese pronunciation: [ˈpɐ̃w puɾ ˈðewʃ], "Bread by God") is the Portuguese tradition of souling celebrated all over Portugal, named for the soulmass-cakes given to the poor on All Saints' Day, typically by children and youth. Names for the custom vary through different regions of the country, for instance, around Leiria it is known as "Dia do Bolinho" ("(Soul) Cake Day").

== Origins ==
There are records of the day of Pão-de-Deus in the 15th century. On 1 November 1755 in Lisbon, after the vast majority of the city's residents lost everything to the Great Lisbon earthquake the survivors had to ask for this bread in the neighbouring towns.

== Customs ==
From early in the morning (8 or 9 am) children meet together and walk around the neighborhood, knock at all doors and local stores and say "Pão-por-Deus" to the adults they meet.

People at home give them small gifts such as broas (small bread-like cakes flavored heavily with anise and nuts), chocolates, candy, nuts, fruit, or in some cases, money.

At the local stores, the offers are different. A store may give the children treats or a sample of a product they sell: bakers give a little bread, fruit stalls give some chestnuts, and so on.

In the Azores, the children are given a cake called "caspiada" during this ritual begging. The cakes have the shape of the top of a skull.

The Pão-de-Deus or Santoro is the bread, or offering, that is given to the dead, the Molete or Samagaio (also called sabatina, raiva da criança (child's rage)) is the bread, or offering, that is given when a child is born.

== Rhyme ==
Bread-for-God, bread-for-God,
bag full we go with God.

or

Little soul and sponge cakes
For me and for you,
To give to the deceased
Who are dead and buried
To the beautiful, beautiful cross
Knock, knock!
The lady that's inside
Sitting on a little stool
Please get up
To come and give a nickel.

If candy is given:

This house smells like maizebread,
Here live good people.
This house smells of wine,
Here lives a little saint.

If no candy is given:

This house smells of garlic
Here lives a scarecrow.
This house smells like grease
Here leaves a dead person.
Bread, bread for god's sake,
Fill my bag,
and I'll go away.

If they are not satisfied they say

May the evil weevil,
strike you in the pot,
and leave you no,
bran or crumbs left

Azores version

Give bread for God
Which God gave you
To share
With the faithful of God
For the dead
From you ...

When the begging is unfruitful:

You lock me out
I flee to the street
And may it all be
For the love of God

Pão-por-Deus, pão-por-Deus,
Saco cheio vamos com Deus.

ou

Bolinhos e bolinhós
Para mim e para vós,
Para dar aos finados
Que estão mortos e enterrados
À bela, bela cruz
Truz, Truz!
A senhora que está lá dentro
Sentada num banquinho
Faz favor de s'alevantar
Para vir dar um tostãozinho.

Se dão doces:

Esta casa cheira a broa,
Aqui mora gente boa.
Esta casa cheira a vinho,
Aqui mora um santinho.

Se não dão doces:

Esta casa cheira a alho
Aqui mora um espantalho.
Esta casa cheira a unto
Aqui mora algum defunto
Pão, pão por deus à mangarola,
encham-me o saco,
e vou-me embora.

Se não ficarem satisfeitos dizem:

O gorgulho gorgulhote,
lhe dê no pote,
e lhe não deixe,
farelo nem farelote

Versão dos Açores

Dae pão-por-Deus
Que vos deu Deus
P'ra repartir
C'os fieis de Deus
Pelos defuntos
De vo'meces...

Quando o peditório é infructuoso:

Tranca me dáes
fujo p'rá rua
E seja tudo
Pelo amor de Deus

== See also ==
- Culture of Portugal
- Soul cake
- Allerheiligenstriezel
