= Skelly =

Skelly may refer to:

== People ==
- Skelly (surname)
- Skelly Alvero (born 2002), French footballer
- Sam McCrory (loyalist) (1965–2022), Northern Ireland paramilitary member and gay activist nicknamed "Skelly"
- J. Skelly Wright (1911–1988), United States circuit judge

== Fictional characters ==
- Skelly, a character in the video game Chrono Cross
- Skelly, a character in the video game I Spy Spooky Mansion
- Skelly, a character in the video game Hades

== Other uses ==
- Skelly (lawn ornament), a Halloween skeleton lawn ornament created by The Home Depot
- Skelly Oil, a defunct oil company
- Skellytown, Texas, a town originally named Skelly after the founder of Skelly Oil
- Skelly Peak, Antarctica
- Skelly Field at H. A. Chapman Stadium, at University of Tulsa, Oklahoma, U.S.

== See also ==
- Skelley (disambiguation)
- Skellyville, Kansas
- Skully (game), a children's game
