= Poisoned candy myths =

Urban legends, especially about trick-or-treating

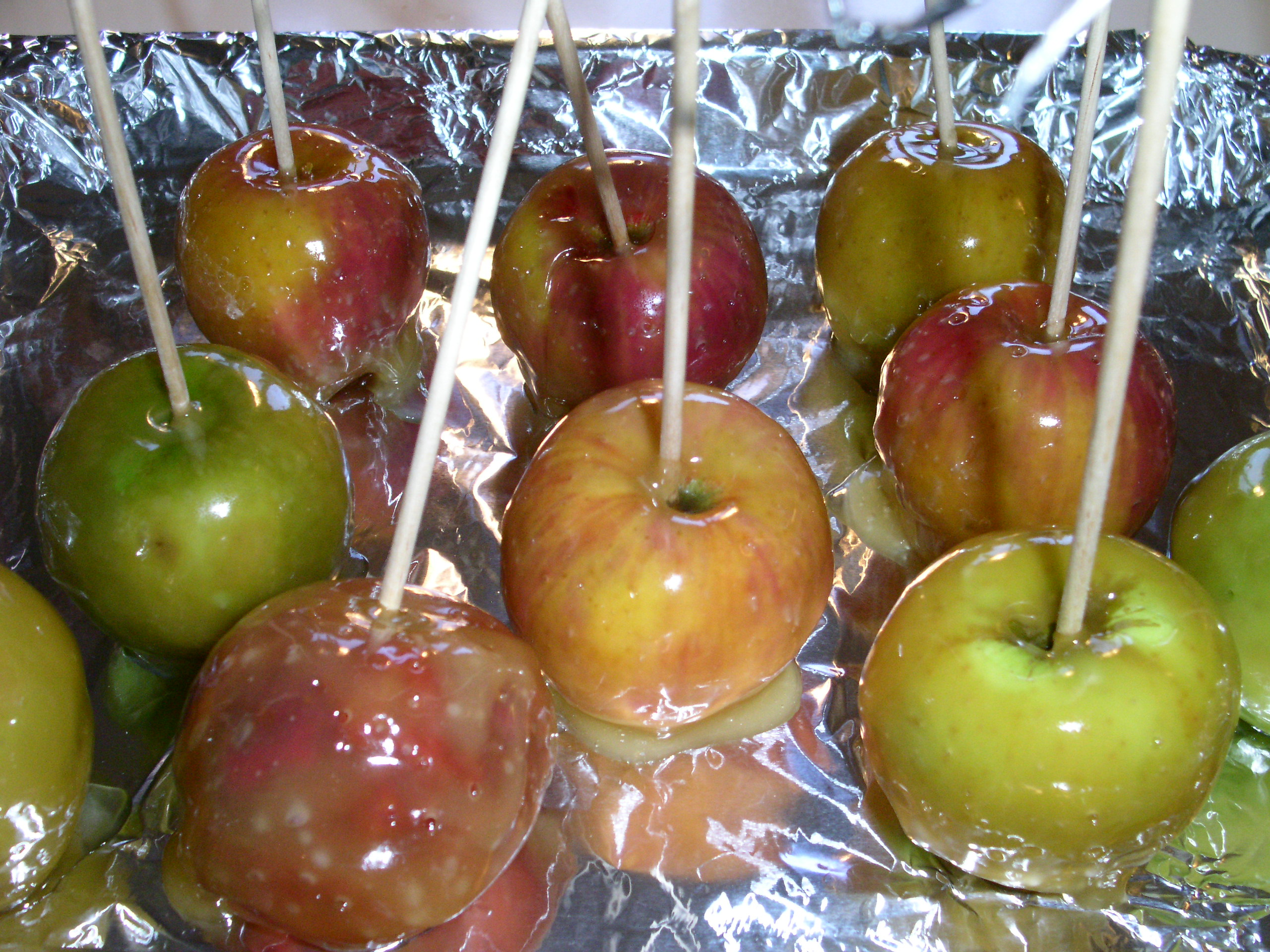
Apples and homemade treats were common gifts to trick-or-treating children in the earlier parts of 20th century. Over time, parents preferred individually wrapped, store-bought candy.

Poisoned candy myths are mostly urban legends about malevolent strangers intentionally hiding poisons, drugs, inedible items or sharp objects such as razor blades in candy, which they then distribute with the intent of harming random children, especially during Halloween trick-or-treating. These myths, originating in the United States, serve as modern cautionary tales to children and parents and repeat two themes that are common in urban legends: danger to children and contamination of food.

There have been confirmed cases of poisoned candy, but these are rare. No cases of strangers killing children this way have been proven. Commonly, the story appears in the media when a young child dies suddenly after Halloween. Medical investigations into the actual cause of death have always shown that these children did not die from eating candy given to them by strangers. However, in rare cases, adult family members have spread this story to cover up filicide or accidental deaths. In other incidents, a child who has been told about poisoned candy places a dangerous object or substance in a pile of candy and pretends that it was the work of a stranger. This behavior is called the copycat effect. Folklorists, scholars, and law enforcement experts say that the story that strangers put poison into candy and give that candy to trick-or-treating children has been "thoroughly debunked".

Worries that candy from strangers might be poisoned have led to the rise of alternative events to trick-or-treating, such as events held at Christian churches, police and fire stations, community centers, and retail stores. The primary risk to children's health and safety on Halloween is being killed by a car.

== History of the myth ==
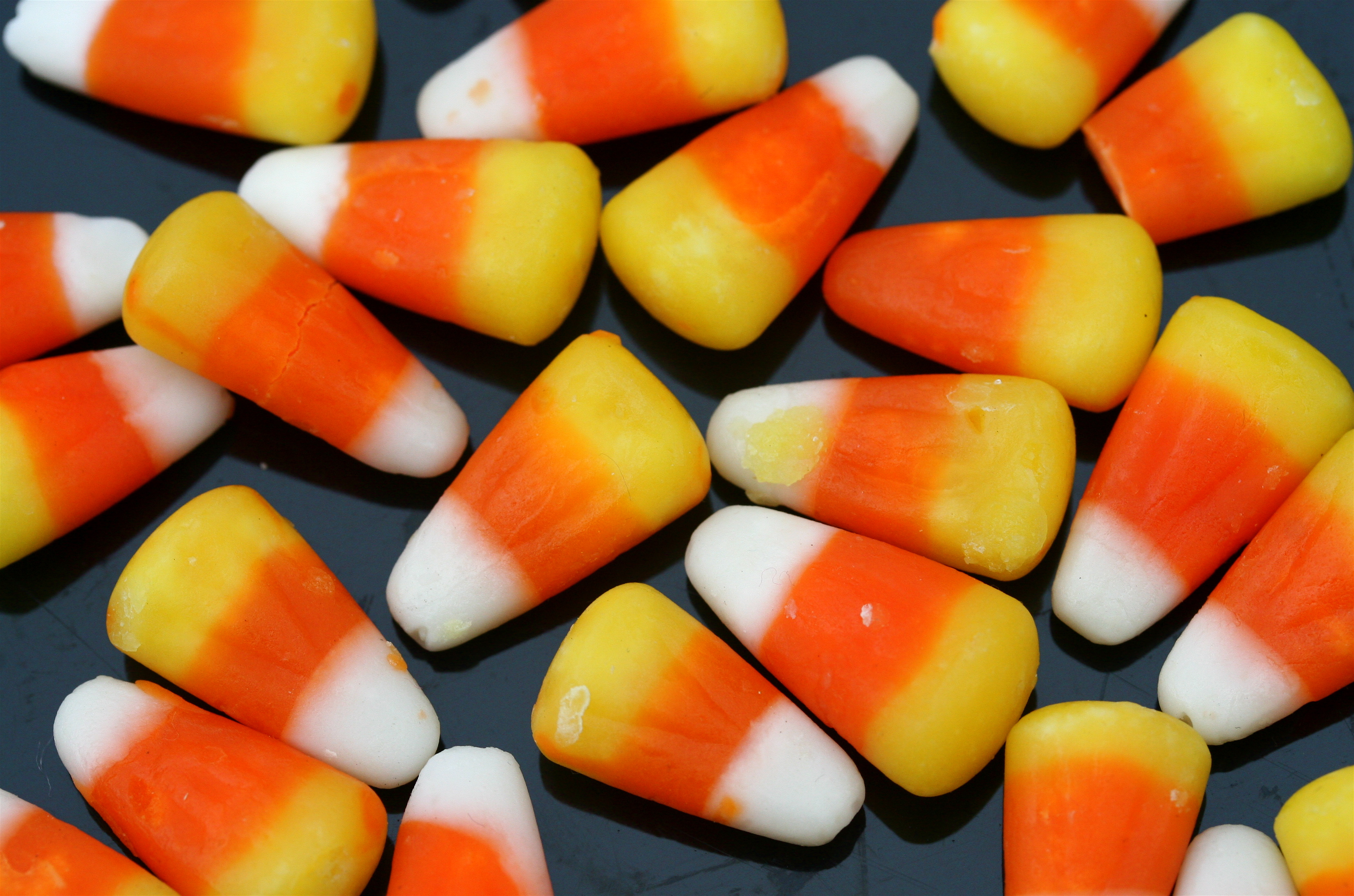
Candies such as candy corn were regularly sold in bulk during the 19th century. Later, parents thought that pre-packaged foods were more sanitary.

Claims that candy was poisoned or adulterated gained general credence during the Industrial Revolution, when food production moved out of the home or local area, where it was made in familiar ways by known and trusted people, to strangers using unknown ingredients and unfamiliar machines and processes. Some doctors publicly claimed that they were treating children poisoned by candy every day. If a child became ill and had eaten candy, the candy was widely assumed to be the cause. However, no cases of illness or death were ever substantiated.

In the 1890s and 1900s, the US Bureau of Chemistry, in conjunction with state agencies, tested hundreds of kinds of candy and found no evidence of poisons or adulteration. These tests revealed that inexpensive glucose (from corn syrup) was in common use for cheap candies, that some candies contained trace amounts of copper from uncoated copper cooking pans, and that coal tar dyes were being used for coloring, but there was no evidence of the many types of poison, industrial waste, garbage, or other adulterants alleged to be present. Eventually, the claims that children were being sickened by candy were put down to indigestion due to overeating, or to other causes, including food poisoning due to improper cooking, hygiene, or storage of meat and other foods.

=== Social causes ===
The prevalence and persistence of these myths during the 1960s and 1970s, a time of social upheaval, greater racial integration, and improved status for women, reflected societal questions about who was trustworthy. Because society was struggling with questions about whether to trust neighbors in newly integrated neighborhoods, or young women who were publicly rejecting the subservient, motherhood-focused roles previously assigned to women, these stories about unidentifiable neighbors allegedly harming random, innocent children during an event intended to bring happiness to these children caught and retained the public imagination in a way that accurate stories about a judgmental neighbor, an abusive parent, or an adult carelessly leaving harmful chemicals where children can reach them, would not have. An academic view sees this as an example of a rumor panic, with Halloween developing as a carnival-like folk institution – meant to release social tensions – losing its functionality as neighborhoods themselves break down (for various reasons).

=== Effects ===
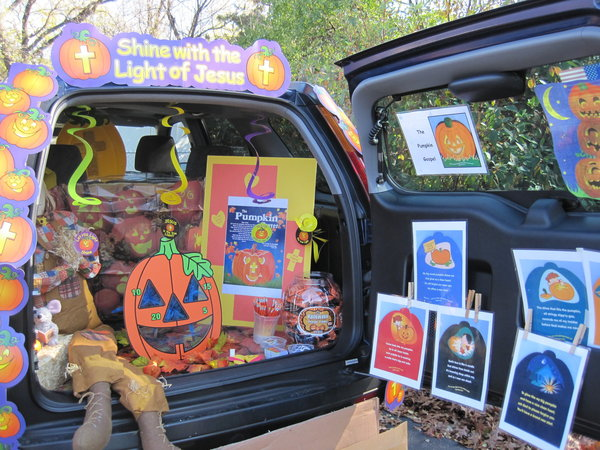
An automobile trunk at a trunk-or-treat event at a church in Illinois

Due to their fears, parents and communities restricted trick-or-treating and developed alternative "safe" events, such as trunk-or-treat events held at Christian churches. This collective fear also served as the impetus for the "safe" trick-or-treating offered by many local malls.

This story also promoted the sale of individually wrapped, brand-name candies and discouraged people from giving homemade treats to children.

The myth may also distract parents from the primary safety risk on Halloween, which is children being killed by cars. In the US, young children ages 4 to 8 are ten times as likely to be killed by a car on Halloween than on any other day of the year. Children of all ages (age 0 to 17) are three times as likely to be killed by a vehicle on Halloween than during the rest of the year.

== Candy-tampering myth ==
=== Development of the modern candy-tampering myth ===
Several events in the late 20th century fostered the modern-day candy tampering myth.

In 1959, a California dentist, William Shyne, gave candy-coated laxative pills to trick-or-treaters. He was charged with outrage of public decency and unlawful dispensing of drugs.

In 1964, a disgruntled Long Island, New York woman gave out packages of inedible objects to children who she believed were too old to be trick-or-treating. The packages contained items such as steel wool, dog biscuits, and ant buttons (which were clearly labeled with the word "poison"). Though nobody was injured, she was prosecuted and pleaded guilty to endangering children. The same year saw media reports of lye-filled bubble gum being handed out in Detroit and rat poison being given in Philadelphia, although these reports were never substantiated to be actual events.

Another notable milestone in the spread of the candy tampering myths was an article published in The New York Times in 1970. This article claimed that "Those Halloween goodies that children collect this weekend on their rounds of 'trick or treating' may bring them more horror than happiness" and provided specific examples of potential tampering.

Reports of poisoned candy and allegations of copycat incidents peaked shortly after the Chicago Tylenol murders, in late September and early October 1982. The case involved an unidentified person poisoning a few bottles of over-the-counter medication in stores, resulting in several deaths.

=== Debunking the myths ===
Joel Best, a sociologist, specializes in the scholarly study of candy-tampering legends. He collected newspaper reports from 1958 to 1983 in search of evidence of candy tampering. Fewer than 90 instances might have qualified as actual candy tampering. In none of the cases does he attribute the events to "random attempts to harm children" during the Halloween holiday. Instead, most cases were attempts by adults to gain financial compensation or, far more commonly, by children to get attention. Best found five child deaths that were initially thought by local authorities to be caused by homicidal strangers, but none of those were sustained by investigation.

Fabrications by children are particularly common. Children sometimes copy or act out the stories about tampered candy that they overhear, by adding pins to or pouring household cleaners on their candy and then reporting the now-unsafe candy to their parents. In these incidents, the children have not been harmed; they know that the dangerous item is present and that it would be unsafe to eat the candy.

Far more prevalent during the same period were reports of vandalism, racist incidents, or children being injured in pedestrian–vehicle collisions on Halloween.

=== Misattributed deaths ===
The deaths of five children were initially blamed on stranger poisoning. A key quality of the poisoned candy myths is that the poisoner is a stranger who is indiscriminately murdering children, rather than dying from an unrelated medical condition or being poisoned by a family member. All of these claims were proven false upon investigation; none of them were poisonings by strangers.

List of misattributed deaths
Actual cause	Year	Age	Location	Description
Accidental death	1970	age 5	Detroit area	The boy died after finding and eating his uncle's heroin. The family attempted to protect the uncle by claiming the drug had been sprinkled in the child's Halloween candy.
Murdered by father	1974	age 8	Deer Park, Texas	The boy died after eating a cyanide-laced package of Pixy Stix that his father had planted in his trick-or-treat pile. The father, Ronald Clark O'Bryan, also gave out poisoned candy to other children in an attempt to cover up the murder, though no other children consumed the poisoned treats. The murderer, who had wanted to claim life insurance money, was executed in 1984. Because the poisoned candy myth describes random or indiscriminate murders by strangers, rather than the murder of a son by his own father, this is not technically an example of a poisoned candy myth.
Natural death unrelated to candy	1978	age 2	Flint, Michigan	The boy died after eating Halloween candy. However, toxicology tests found no evidence of poison, and his death was determined to be due to natural causes.
Natural death due to pre-existing medical condition	1990	age 7	Santa Monica, California	The girl died while trick-or-treating. Early press reports blamed poisoned candy, despite her parents telling the police that she had previously been diagnosed with a serious medical condition, an enlarged heart, which was the actual cause of death.
Natural death due to infection	2001	age 4	Vancouver, British Columbia	The girl died after eating some Halloween candy. However, there was no evidence of poisoned candy, and she died of a streptococcus infection.

=== Media and the myth ===
Despite these claims of poisoned candy being eventually proved false, the news media promoted the story continuously throughout the 1980s, with local news stations featuring frequent coverage. During this time, cases of poisoning were repeatedly reported based on unsubstantiated claims or before a full investigation could be completed, and often were never followed up on. This one-sided coverage contributed to the overall panic and caused rival media outlets to issue reports of candy tampering as well. However, Joel Best says that the spread of the myth cannot be blamed solely on the media and that it must have been transmitted via word of mouth as well.

By 1985, the media had driven the hysteria about candy poisonings to such a point that an ABC News/Washington Post poll found that 60% of parents feared that their children would be injured or killed because of Halloween candy sabotage.

Advice columnists entered the fray during the 1980s and 1990s with both Ask Ann Landers and Dear Abby warning parents of the horrors of candy tampering:

In recent years, there have been reports of people with twisted minds putting razor blades and poison in taffy apples and Halloween candy. It is no longer safe to let your child eat treats that come from strangers.

— Ann Landers in 1995

Somebody's child will become violently ill or die after eating poisoned candy or an apple containing a razor blade.

— Dear Abby in 1983

== Candy tampering by friends and family ==
Almost all tampering cases—at a rate of one or two per year—involve a friend or family member, usually as a prank. Almost all of those involved sharp objects, rather than poisoning. Three-quarters of them resulted in no injuries, and the rest resulted in only minor injuries. No child has ever been killed by eating a Halloween candy from a stranger.

== Confirmed case of non-fatal candy tampering ==
In 2000, in Minneapolis, a mentally ill man put needles in candy bars and gave them to trick-or-treaters. One teenager received a minor injury. In 2025 during a Halloween parade, the Santa Fe, Texas police were notified by at least three different homes that sewing pins were discovered in chocolate bars that were thrown to the crowd. No one in this case was injured.

== See also ==
- 1858 Bradford sweets poisoning – accidental confusion of ingredients, causing arsenic poisoning
- 2016 Punjab sweet poisoning – intentional poisoning by an angry candymaker
- 2018 Australian strawberry contamination – sewing needles put in fresh fruit
- Caraga candy poisonings – accidental contamination with bacteria, causing diarrhea
