= Summerween =

Cultural phenomenon combining Halloween traditions with summer celebrations

Summerween is an informal cultural and retail phenomenon that occurs during the summer months, incorporating elements of Halloween festivities. The term originated in the 2012 Gravity Falls episode "Summerween," in which the series' characters celebrate Halloween during the summer.

Since the early 2020s, the concept has been adopted, primarily in the United States, for parties, social gatherings, marketing campaigns, and social-media posts with a Halloween theme during the summer months.

== Origin ==
The term was first used in the animated series Gravity Falls episode "Summerween," initially broadcast on 5 October 2012, which depicts the titular fictional town celebrating Halloween twice a year, with Summerween taking place on 22 June. This has been the accepted celebration day for those who observe Summerween. This was intended as surreal humor. For example, the inhabitants of the town carve "jack-o'-melons" instead of jack-o'-lanterns. The concept of celebrating Halloween in summer was later adopted by fans for informal celebrations.

== Wider adoption ==
Summerween began to enter mainstream U.S. culture in 2024. Media coverage expanded considerably in 2025. Interest is continuing into 2026.

=== Media coverage ===
A 2024 CNN report noted that retailers had begun to introduce Halloween-related products as early as midsummer in order to profit from the growing popularity of Summerween.

Newsweek first covered Summerween in 2024, describing a Summerween party event that had taken place in Pennsylvania. The event had gathered considerable interest via social media.

Coverage by The New York Times, CNN and NBC's Today positioned Summerween as part of a wider transformation in American consumer behavior. For example, consumer buying patterns for Halloween related articles were occurring earlier than before.

In 2025, Forbes reported that major retail chains such as Walmart, The Home Depot, and Michaels marketed Summerween merchandise as part of a broader shift toward year-round holiday marketing, comparing it to "Christmas in July".

Broadcast coverage by NBC's Today show in 2025 went so far as to describe Summerween as a "craze" that they postulated could be part of a wider pattern of Americans beginning Halloween celebrations earlier than was previously observed. The broadcast highlighted themed events and retail promotions.

In 2025, CBS News reported that Summerween is a "new season" involving decorating and celebrating in a theme derived from Halloween activities and aesthetics. CBS reported on the popularity of purchasing Summerween-related products amongst Gen Z and millennial shoppers.

In April 2026, Good Morning America reported on the early availability of Halloween-themed animatronics in Home Depot stores. This was presented as being an even earlier introduction of Halloween merchandise described as "Halfway to Halloween", although Summerween was also mentioned. This could be seen as further evidence of Halloween-themed celebrations taking place outside of the traditional Halloween season.

Later in June 2026, Good Morning America reported more directly on Summerween. They covered a Summerween product "drop" by Spirit Halloween, noting that a range of products branded with the Terrifier film had been launched and had quickly sold out. This is believed to be the strongest push of Summerween-specific products (e.g. themed inflatables for use in swimming pools) by Spirit Halloween, compared to previous years.

The summerween2026.com website emerged during the Spring of 2026. This website provided aggregated Summerween content from various social media sources. The widespread use of the #summerween hashtag is evidenced through this website.

There is evidence that interest in Summerween was spreading to the UK. The Asda supermarket chain stocked a range of items specifically sold under a Summerween theme. This was covered by the Manchester Evening News, a significant local news outlet in North West England.

In June 2026 (two days prior to the canonical date of Summerween according to Gravity Falls), the pop culture website Vice published an article covering Summerween. The article reflected on the author's personal affinity for Summerween and posited four ways to spend Summerween: Watching themed movies, home decorating, hosting a themed party, and making themed bakery products.

== Products ==
=== Home decor ===
Summerween has been widely associated with "spooky" home decor and crafting products sold during the summer months. These products may be identical to those sold for Halloween, or they may feature Halloween themes with a summer twist. Such products have been widely available at chains such as Michaels and Home Depot since the emergence of Summerween as a mainstream cultural phenomenon.

=== Toys ===
Starting on 7th August 2025, Lego introduced their "Summerween Home Décor" range of products.

== In mass media ==
=== Television ===
As noted above, Summerween originated in the Gravity Falls episode "Summerween."

=== Books ===
On 7 April 2026, Pan Macmillan reported that they have acquired the rights to publish the book Cruel Summerween by Heather Spellman, according to industry source The Bookseller. This can be taken as evidence that Summerween had started to enter the mainstream lexicon.

On 12 May 2026, Penguin Random House published the children's book, But I'm a Pumpkin!: A Summerween Story by Kat Choppy with illustrations by Heidi Moreno.

=== Music ===
Various pop music acts have released songs either with Summerween in the title or lyrics, or making use of adjacent themes and Summerween promotion concepts. Initial activity in this area coincided with the growth in popularity of Summerween during 2025, including examples such as the LVCRFT/Sarah Barrios song "Summerween Midsummer Scream", the Punk Racks song "Happy Summerween", the Freaky Furry Monsters song "Halloween All Year Long", the Aurelio Voltaire album "Summerween Surf", and the Official Illuminati album "Summerween".
