= Skelley =

Skelley is both a surname and a given name. Notable people with the name include:

- Arrin Skelley (born 1966), American voice actor
- Chris Skelley (born 1993), English Paralympic judoka
- Dana Skelley, British civil engineer
- John Skelley (1918–1971), Australian rules footballer
- Skelley Adu Tutu (born 1979), Ghanaian footballer

== See also ==
- Skelly (disambiguation)
