= Halloween =

Annual celebration held on 31 October

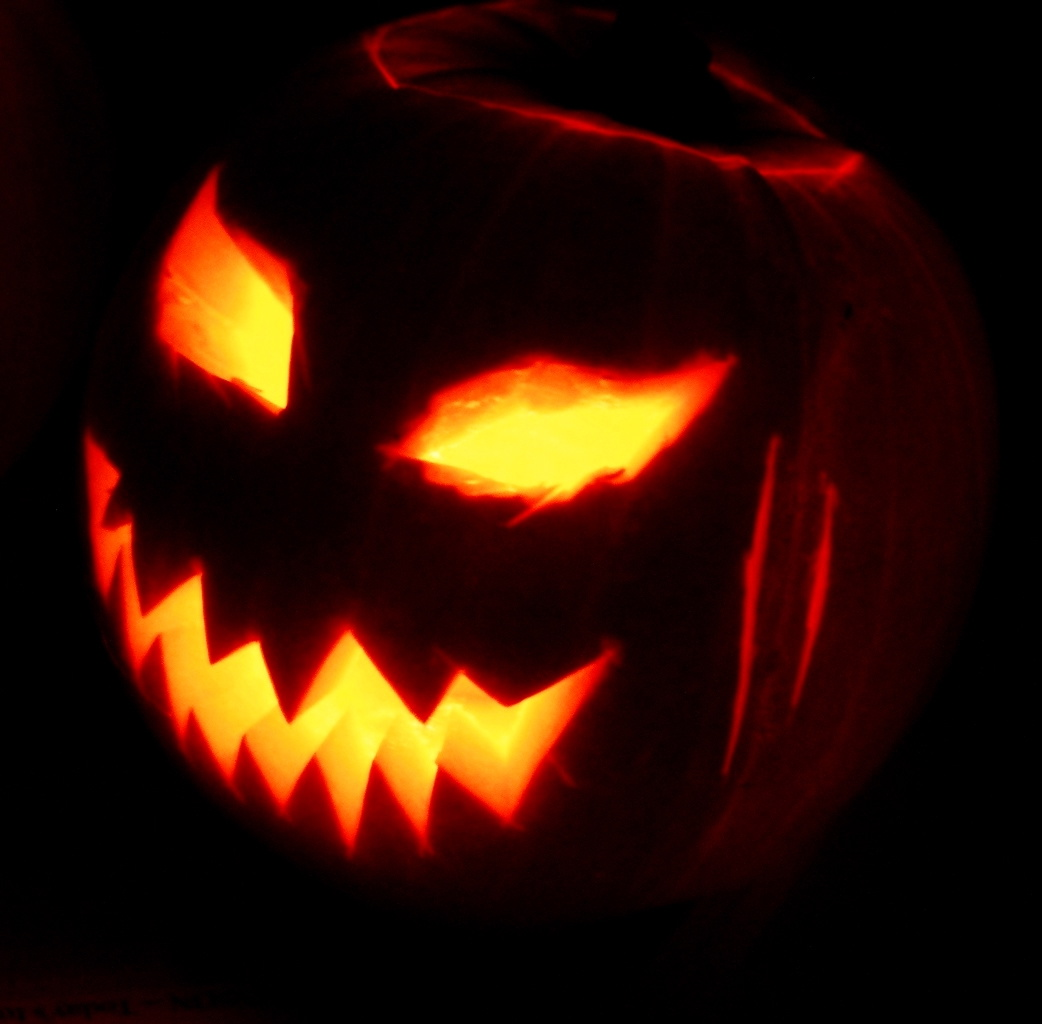
- A jack-o'-lantern, the carving and displaying of which are a Halloween tradition
- Also called: Hallowe'en; Allhalloween; All Hallows' Eve; All Saints' Eve
- Observed by: Western Christians and many non-Christians around the world
- Type: Christian, cultural
- Significance: First day of Allhallowtide
- Celebrations: Trick-or-treating, costume parties, making jack-o'-lanterns, lighting bonfires, divination, apple bobbing, visiting haunted attractions
- Observances: Church services, prayer, fasting, vigil
- Date: 31 October
- Frequency: Annual
- Related to: Samhain, Hop-tu-Naa, Calan Gaeaf, Allantide, Day of the Dead, All Saints' Day, St. Martin's Day, Reformation Day, Mischief Night (cf. vigil), Summerween

Halloween, (Note: Less commonly spelled Hallowe'en; also called Allhalloween.) also known as All Hallows' Eve or All Saints' Eve, is a celebration observed in many countries on 31 October, the eve of Western Christianity's feast of All Hallows' Day. It is at the beginning of the observance of Allhallowtide, the time in the Christian liturgical year dedicated to remembering the dead, including saints (hallows), Christian martyrs, and all the faithful departed. In popular culture, Halloween has become a celebration of horror and is associated with the macabre and the supernatural.

One theory holds that many Halloween traditions were influenced by Celtic harvest festivals, particularly the Gaelic festival Samhain, which is believed to have pagan roots. Some theories go further and suggest that Samhain may have been Christianized as All Hallows' Day, along with its eve, by the Christian Church. Other scholars say Halloween began independently as a Christian holiday, being the vigil of All Hallows' Day. Celebrated in Ireland and Scotland for centuries, Irish and Scottish immigrants brought many Halloween customs to North America in the 19th century. Through American influence, various Halloween customs spread to other countries by the late 20th and early 21st centuries.

Popular Halloween activities include trick-or-treating (or the related guising and souling), attending Halloween costume parties, carving pumpkins or turnips into jack-o'-lanterns, lighting bonfires, apple bobbing, divination games, playing pranks, visiting haunted attractions, telling frightening stories, and watching horror or Halloween-themed films. Some Christians practice the observances of All Hallows' Eve, including attending church services and lighting candles on the graves of the dead, although it is a secular celebration for others. Historically, some Christians abstained from meat on All Hallows' Eve, a tradition reflected in the eating of certain vegetarian foods on this day, including apples, potato pancakes, and soul cakes.

== Etymology ==
Hallow derives from Middle English halowen, from Old English hālig which means holy; it has been used synonymously with the word saint. The word Halloween or Hallowe'en comes from the Lowland Scots form of All Hallows' Eve (the evening before All Hallows' Day): even is the Scots term for 'eve' or 'evening', and is contracted to e'en or een; so (All) Hallow(s) E(v)en became Halloween. A term equivalent to 'All Hallows Eve' as attested in Old English. Thus, the name originates in Christianity, and means "Saints' eve(ning)".

== History ==
=== Christian origins and historical customs ===
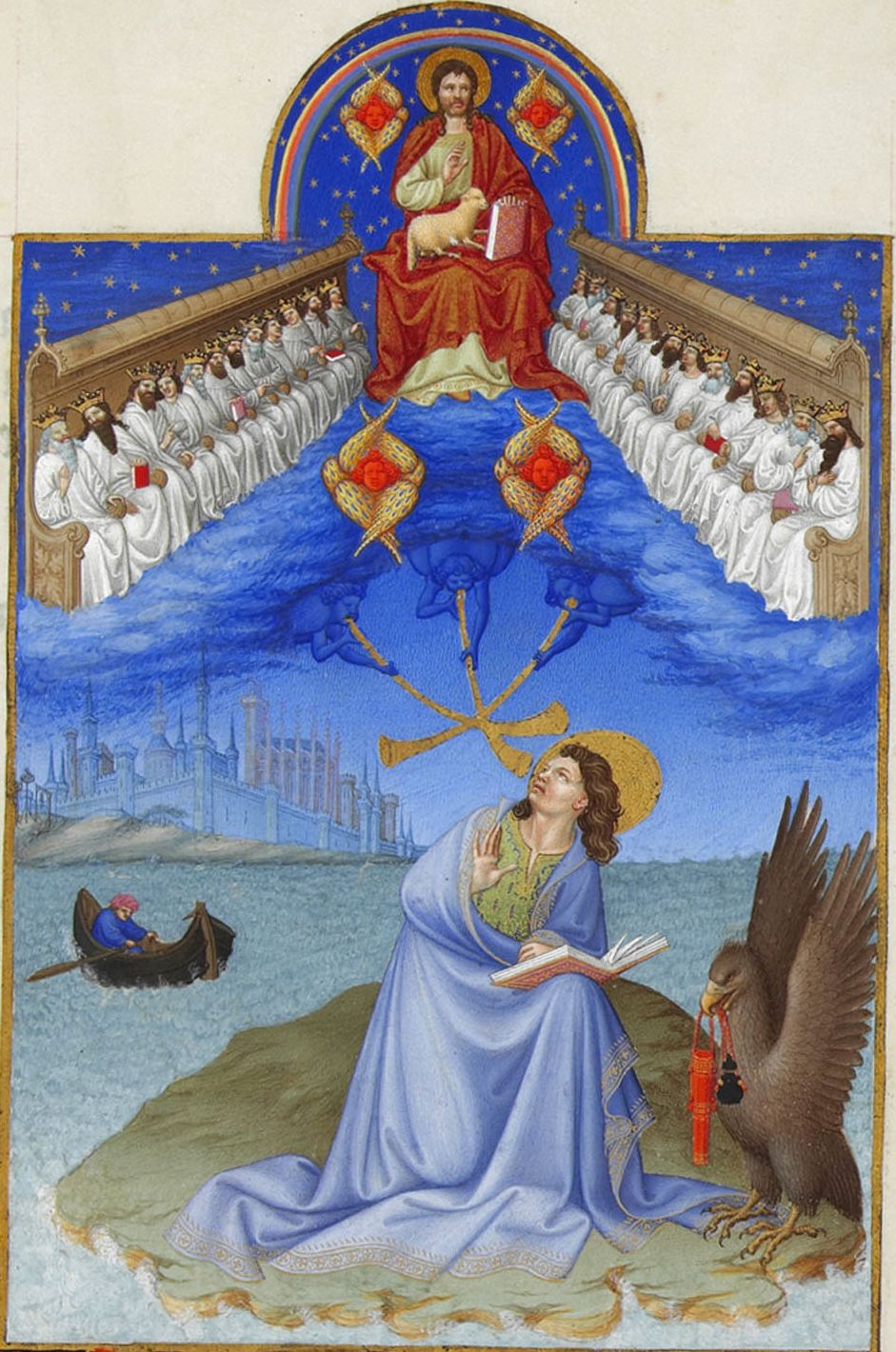
The painting Saint John on Patmos (1416) depicts the communion of saints, a Christian theological concept teaching the union of the members of the Church, both the living and the dead.

'Halloween' comes from All Hallows' Eve, being the night before All Hallows' Day (All Saints' Day), which is followed by All Souls' Day on 2 November. These three days are a part of Allhallowtide, a time when Western Christians honour all Christian martyrs and saints, as well as pray for departed souls. Halloween is influenced by Christian beliefs and practices surrounding these holy days. Christian holidays such as Christmas and Easter have vigils that begin the night before, as does All Hallows.

After the persecution of Christians in the Roman Empire, "there were more martyrs than there were days in the year, and so one day was set apart in honor of them all, and called All Saints' Day." Commemorations of all saints and martyrs were held by several churches on various dates, mostly in springtime. In 4th-century Roman Edessa it was held on 13 May, and that date was endorsed by Pope Boniface IV in 609, when he re-dedicated the Pantheon in Rome to Mary and all martyrs. This was the date of Lemuria, an ancient Roman festival of the dead, when it was believed that restless and vengeful souls wandered. Some folklorists also suggest the ancient Roman festival of Parentalia (including Feralia) influenced All Saints' and All Souls' days. Parentalia involved a commemorative meal at the graves of relatives, during which food and drink were offered to the dead. Despite opposition from Church leaders, Christian Romans continued this custom, extending it to the saints and martyrs.

There is evidence that by 800, churches in Ireland and Northumbria were holding a feast commemorating all saints on 1 November. In 835, the Frankish Empire officially adopted 1 November as the date of All Saints' Day, which was endorsed by Pope Gregory IV. This may have been promoted by Alcuin of Northumbria, who was a member of Charlemagne's court, or by the Irish clerics and scholars who were also members of the Frankish court. The date was influenced by Celtic or Germanic idea traditions commemorating the dead at the beginning of winter. They may have seen it as the most fitting time to do so, as it is a time of "dying" in nature. It is also suggested the change was made on the "practical grounds that Rome in summer could not accommodate the great number of pilgrims who flocked to it", and perhaps because of public health concerns over Roman Fever, which claimed a number of lives during Rome's summers.

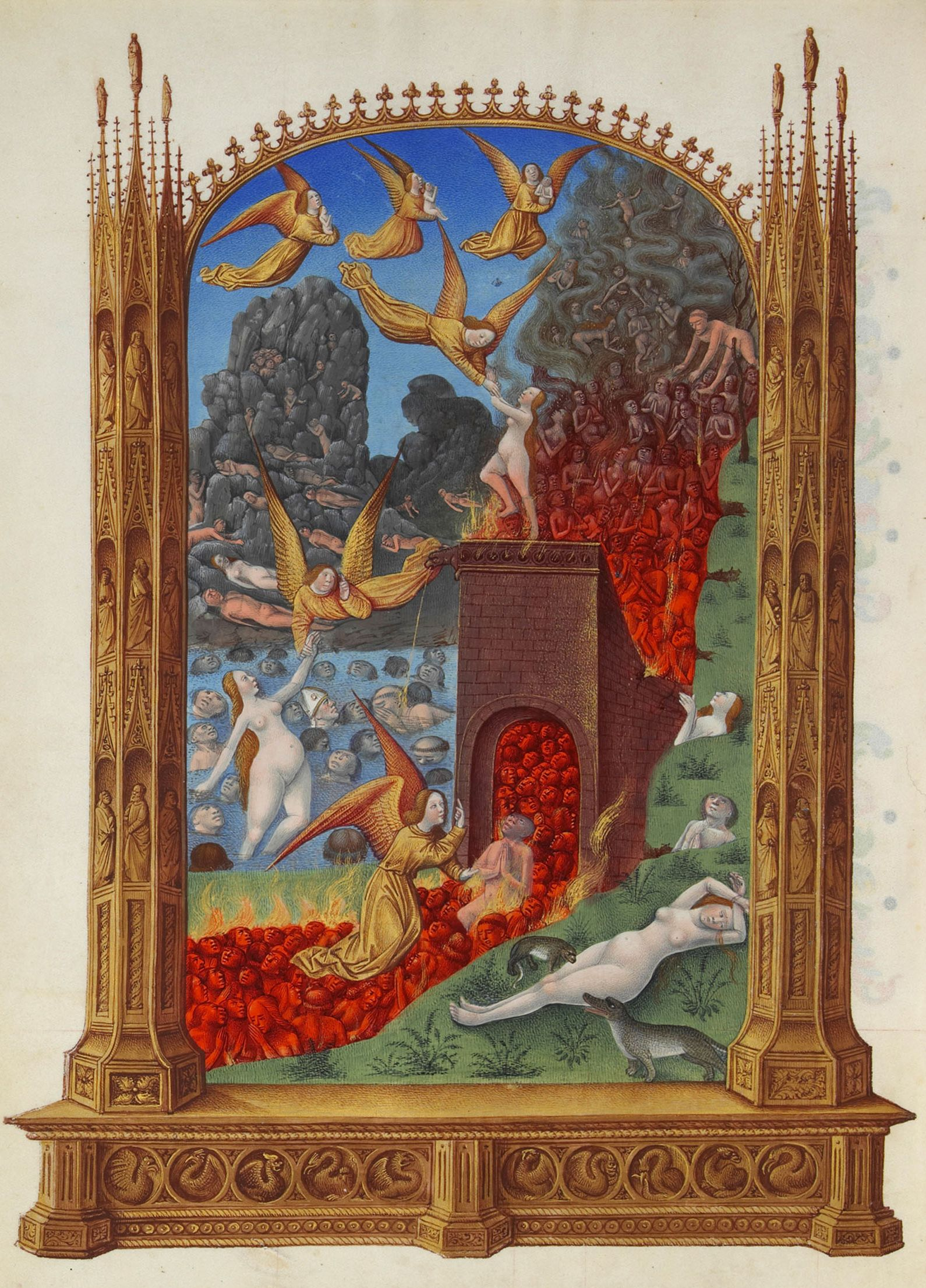
Purgatory depicted in the Très Riches Heures du Duc de Berry, a 14th-century Illuminated manuscript.

All Souls' Day, a feast commemorating all deceased Christians, became widespread in the 12th century. Its date was fixed on 2 November, the day after All Saints', and by the end of the century, both had become important holy days in Western Christianity. On All Souls' Day, people prayed for the dead and church bells were rung for souls in Purgatory. It was also customary for criers dressed in black to walk the streets "ringing a mournful bell and calling on all people to remember the poor souls in purgatory".

The All Souls' Day custom of baking and sharing soul cakes for all christened souls has been suggested as the origin of trick-or-treating. Called "souling", the custom dates back at least as far as the 15th century and was found in parts of England, Wales, Flanders, Southern Germany and Austria. Groups of poor people, often children, would go door to door on All Souls' Day, collecting soul cakes in exchange for praying for the dead, especially the souls of the givers' friends and relatives. Soul cakes were also offered for the souls themselves to eat, being laid on graves, or the "soulers" would act as their representatives. It has been suggested that this replaced the pre-Christian custom of offering food to the dead. As with the Lenten tradition of hot cross buns, soul cakes were often marked with a cross, indicating that they were baked as alms. In parts of the British Isles, "soulers" carried lanterns made of hollowed-out turnips, which might have originally represented souls in purgatory; later jack-o'-lanterns were used to ward off evil spirits.

Christian minister Prince Sorie Conteh linked the wearing of costumes to the belief in vengeful ghosts: "It was traditionally believed that the souls of the departed wandered the earth until All Saints' Day, and All Hallows' Eve provided one last chance for the dead to gain vengeance on their enemies before moving to the next world. In order to avoid being recognized by any soul that might be seeking such vengeance, people would don masks or costumes". According to Lesley Bannatyne, in the Middle Ages, churches in Europe that were too poor to display relics of martyred saints on All Hallows' Day let parishioners dress up as saints instead. Bannatyne opines that this "resembled the pagan custom of parading ghosts to the town limits". Some Christians observe this custom at Halloween today. Many Christians in mainland Europe believed "that once a year, on Hallowe'en, the dead of the churchyards rose for one wild, hideous carnival" known as the danse macabre; compositions have celebrated this belief. It has been suggested as an origin of Halloween costumes. Often depicted in church decoration, the danse macabre urged Christians "not to forget the end of all earthly things". According to an article in Christianity Today, the danse macabre was sometimes enacted in European village pageants and court masques with people "dressing up as corpses from various strata of society".

In Britain, a number of these customs came under attack during the Reformation, as Protestants berated Purgatory as a "popish" doctrine incompatible with the Reformed (Calvinist) doctrine of predestination held by the Anglican Church. State-sanctioned ceremonies associated with the intercession of saints and prayer for souls in Purgatory were abolished during the Elizabethan reform, though All Hallows' Day remained in the Anglican liturgical calendar to commemorate saints as outstanding Christians rather than "semi-divine intercessors". For Protestants, the theology of Allhallowtide was redefined: "souls cannot be journeying from Purgatory on their way to Heaven, as Catholics frequently believe and assert. Instead, the so-called ghosts are thought to be in actuality evil spirits". In parts of England, some Protestants, as well as Catholics, continued souling, candlelit processions, or ringing church bells for the dead; but the Anglican Church eventually suppressed this bell-ringing. Professor of medieval archaeology Mark Donnelly and historian Daniel Diehl write that "barns and homes were blessed to protect people and livestock from the effect of witches, who were believed to accompany the malignant spirits as they traveled the earth".

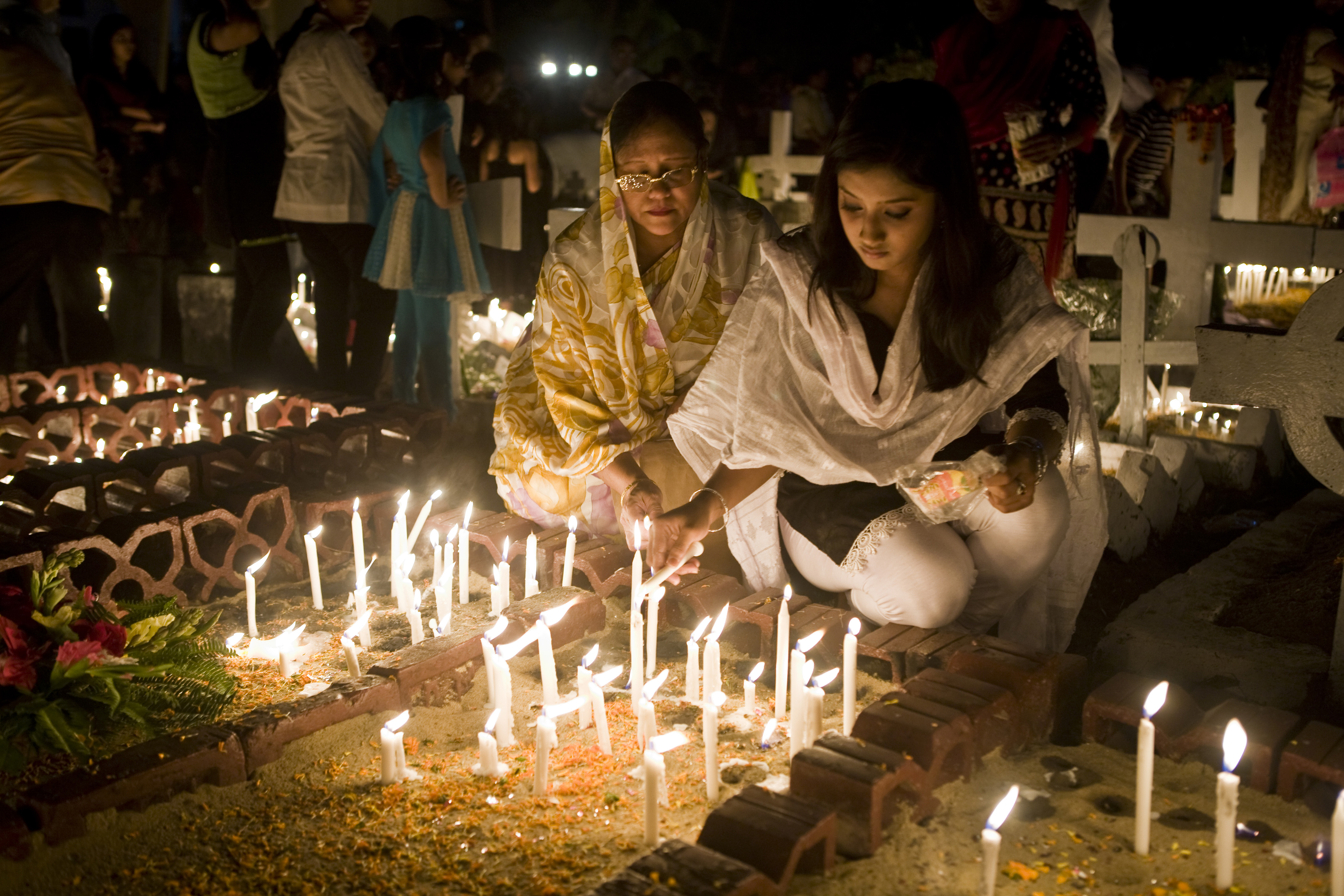
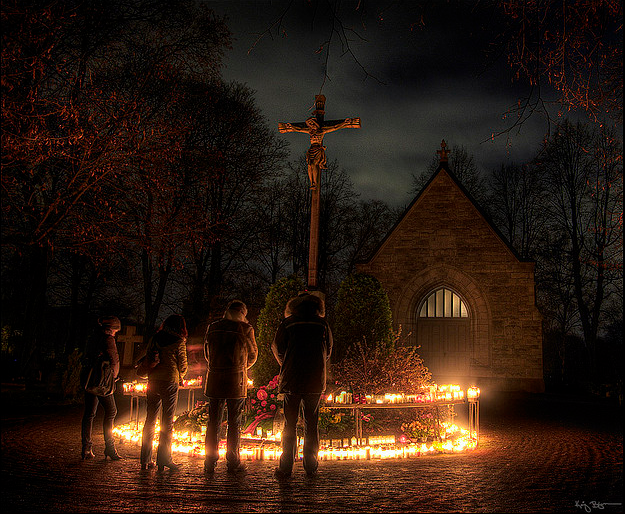
On All Hallows' Eve, Christians in some countries visit cemeteries to pray and place flowers and candles on the graves of loved ones. Top: Christians in Bangladesh lighting candles on graves. Bottom: Lutheran Christians praying and lighting candles at a graveyard crucifix.

After 1605, Allhallowtide in England was eclipsed by Guy Fawkes Night (5 November), which appropriated some of its customs. There, the ending of official Hallowmas ceremonies led to the development of new, unofficial customs. In 18th- and 19th-century rural Lancashire, Catholic families gathered on hills on the night of All Hallows' Eve and one person held a bunch of burning straw on a pitchfork while the rest knelt around him, praying for the souls of relatives and friends until the flames went out. This was known as teen'lay. There was a similar custom in Hertfordshire, and the lighting of "tindle" fires in Derbyshire. Robert A. Davis suggests that bonfires during Allhallowtide referenced "God's instrument of purgation and penance", part of the theology of Christian repentance. Some suggested that candles, lit stoves and fires were originally lit to "guide the poor souls back to earth". Scottish Halloween customs survived the Calvinist Reformation and Guy Fawkes Night because the Presbyterian Church of Scotland acknowledged they were important to "the life cycle and rites of passage of local communities", and would be difficult to stamp out.

There is evidence that by the 16th century, in parts of Europe, it was customary to visit graves at Allhallowtide, "presenting offerings of flowers, candles, and food to deceased relatives". In southern Italy, it was customary during the Middle Ages to set food on the table for wandering souls before leaving for church services. This was banned in the 15th century as being a remnant of a pagan ritual, although the custom also drew thieves. By the 19th century, on All Souls' Eve, food was still left overnight for returning souls in the Abruzzi, Tyrol, the Vosges, Brittany, and Ireland. Candles were also lit in households in these regions, as well as in Ireland, Brittany, Flanders, Bavaria, Bohemia, and Tyrol, to "guide the souls back to visit their earthly homes". The Tyrolean "soul lights" were lamps filled with lard or butter. On All Souls' Day in 19th century Brittany, Catholics also poured libations of milk on the graves of kinfolk, while in Bavaria, Catholics laid soul cakes on graves to feed the hungry souls.

In the 19th century, some Italian churches staged "theatrical re-enactments of scenes from the lives of the saints" on All Hallows' Day, with "participants represented by realistic wax figures". In 1823, the graveyard of Holy Spirit Hospital in Rome presented a scene in which bodies of those who recently died were arrayed around a wax statue of an angel who pointed upward towards heaven. In the same country, "parish priests went house-to-house, asking for small gifts of food which they shared among themselves throughout that night". In 19th-century Spain, there was a procession in San Sebastián to the city cemetery on All Souls' Day, an event that drew sellers of cakes and nuts, and beggars who would "appeal to the tender recollections of one's deceased relations" for sympathy.

=== Celtic folk influence ===
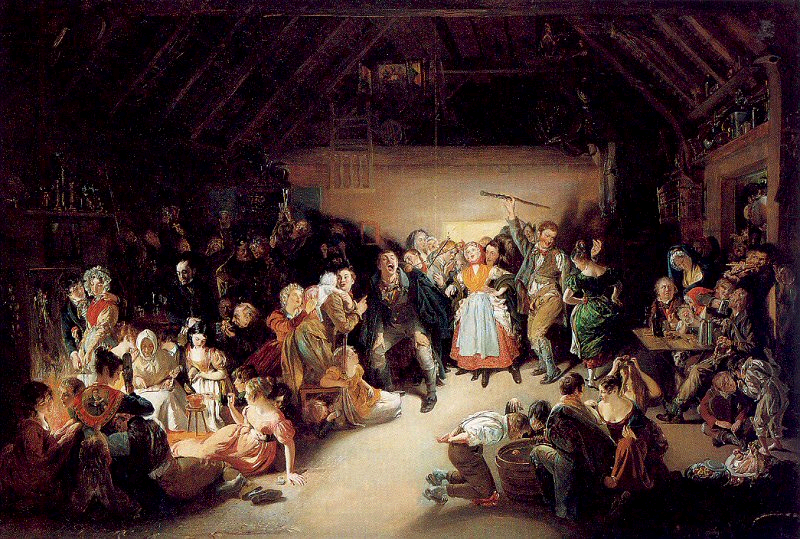
Snap-Apple Night, or All-Hallow Eve, painted by Daniel Maclise in 1833, shows people feasting and playing divination games on Halloween in Ireland.

Halloween is thought to have been influenced by folk customs and beliefs from the Celtic-speaking countries. The origins of some Halloween customs are, by some authors, typically linked to the Gaelic festival Samhain, though other scholars contest this. Historian Ronald Hutton suggests that "its importance was only reinforced by the imposition upon it of a Christian festival", All Saints' Day. Jack Santino, a folklorist, writes that "there was throughout Ireland an uneasy truce existing between customs and beliefs associated with Christianity and those associated with religions that were Irish before Christianity arrived".

Samhain was one of the "quarter days" in the medieval Gaelic calendar and has been celebrated on 31 October – 1 November in Ireland, Scotland, and the Isle of Man, its Manx name being Sauin. The kindred Brittonic festival is called Calan Gaeaf in Wales, Kalan Gwav in Cornwall and Kalan Goañv in Brittany; a name meaning "first day of winter". For Celtic peoples, the day ended and began at sunset; thus the festival begins the evening before 1 November by modern reckoning. The names have been used by historians to refer to Celtic Halloween customs up to the 19th century. "Halloween" is Oíche Shamhna in Irish (sometimes anglicized as "November Eve") and Nos Galan Gaeaf in Welsh (sometimes anglicized as "Winter's Eve").

Samhain marked the end of the harvest season in autumn and beginning of winter or the 'darker half' of the year. Like its summer counterpart, Beltaine, it was seen as a dangerous and liminal time, when the boundary between this world and the Otherworld thinned. This meant the Aos Sí, the 'spirits' or 'fairies', could more easily come into this world and were particularly active. Most scholars "place the origin of fairies in the Celtic pantheon of deities", seeing them as "degraded versions of ancient gods [...] whose power remained active in the people's minds even after they had been officially replaced by later religious beliefs". They were respected and feared, with individuals often invoking the protection of God when approaching their dwellings. In Wales, Calan Gaeaf was the year's most frightening "spirit night" (ysbrydnos), while in Ireland, Samhain was also called "spirit night" (oíche na sprideanna) or "púca night" (oíche na bpúcaí). The spirits or fairies were appeased to ensure the people and livestock survived the winter. Offerings of food and drink, or portions of the crops, were left outside for them. Ronald Hutton says there is no evidence that Samhain was originally a festival of the dead, "but it was certainly a time when supernatural forces were especially to be guarded against or propitiated". He notes the same superstitions about the start of summer, and believes these come from prehistoric beliefs and fears about the turning of the seasons. Nicholas Rogers says that Samhain's association with darkness, liminality and the supernatural influenced the celebration of Halloween. However, he writes that Samhain "did not offer much in the way of actual practices, save in its fire rites" and that most Halloween customs "developed in conjunction with the medieval holy days of All Souls' and All Saints' Day".

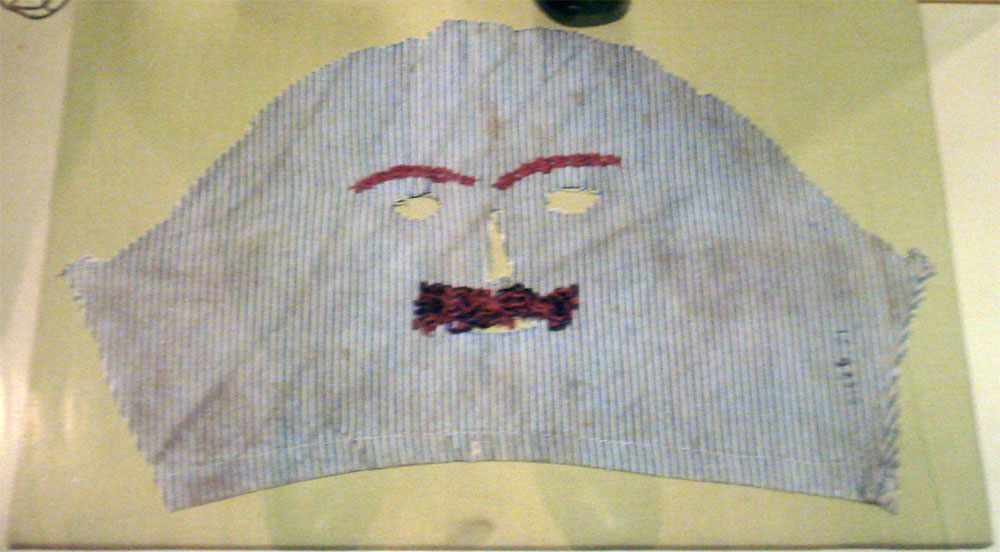
An early 20th-century Irish Halloween mask displayed at the Museum of Country Life in County Mayo, Ireland

In 19th century Ireland, the souls of the dead were said to revisit their homes seeking hospitality on All Hallows' Eve, although this was more often believed to happen on All Souls' Night. Places were set at the dinner table and by the fire to welcome them. The belief that the souls of the dead return home on one night of the year and must be appeased seems to have ancient origins and is found in many cultures. In 19th century Ireland, "candles would be lit and prayers formally offered for the souls of the dead. After this the eating, drinking, and games would begin".

In Ireland and Britain, mainly in Celtic-speaking regions, the household festivities included many divination rituals and games intended to foretell one's future, especially regarding death and marriage. In the 'Celtic' regions it was the most celebrated night of the year for divination. Apples and nuts were often used, and customs included apple bobbing, nut roasting, scrying or mirror-gazing, pouring molten lead or egg whites into water, and dream interpretation, among others. It has been suggested that the use of apples and nuts stems from their importance in Celtic myth, where they are associated with the Otherworld and divine wisdom, as well as their timing as a harvest food. Divination or fortune-telling games are still played at Halloween in Ireland today.

Special bonfires were also lit in these Celtic-speaking regions of the Isles. They did not begin to be recorded in detail until the early modern era, when the tradition was dying out. Accounts from the 18th-19th centuries show that they were believed to have protective powers. In some places, torches lit from the bonfire were carried sunwise around homes and fields in a protective ritual. In the 1900s, James George Frazer theorized that the fires were a kind of imitative or sympathetic magic – they mimicked the Sun, held back the decay and darkness of winter, and burned up all harmful influences. Robert A. Davis contests this, suggesting that the bonfires were grounded in the Christian theology of repentance. They were also used for divination and to ward off demons, malevolent fairies and witches. In Scotland, these bonfires and divination games were banned by church elders in some parishes from the 16th century onward. Bonfires are still lit at Halloween in parts of Ireland.

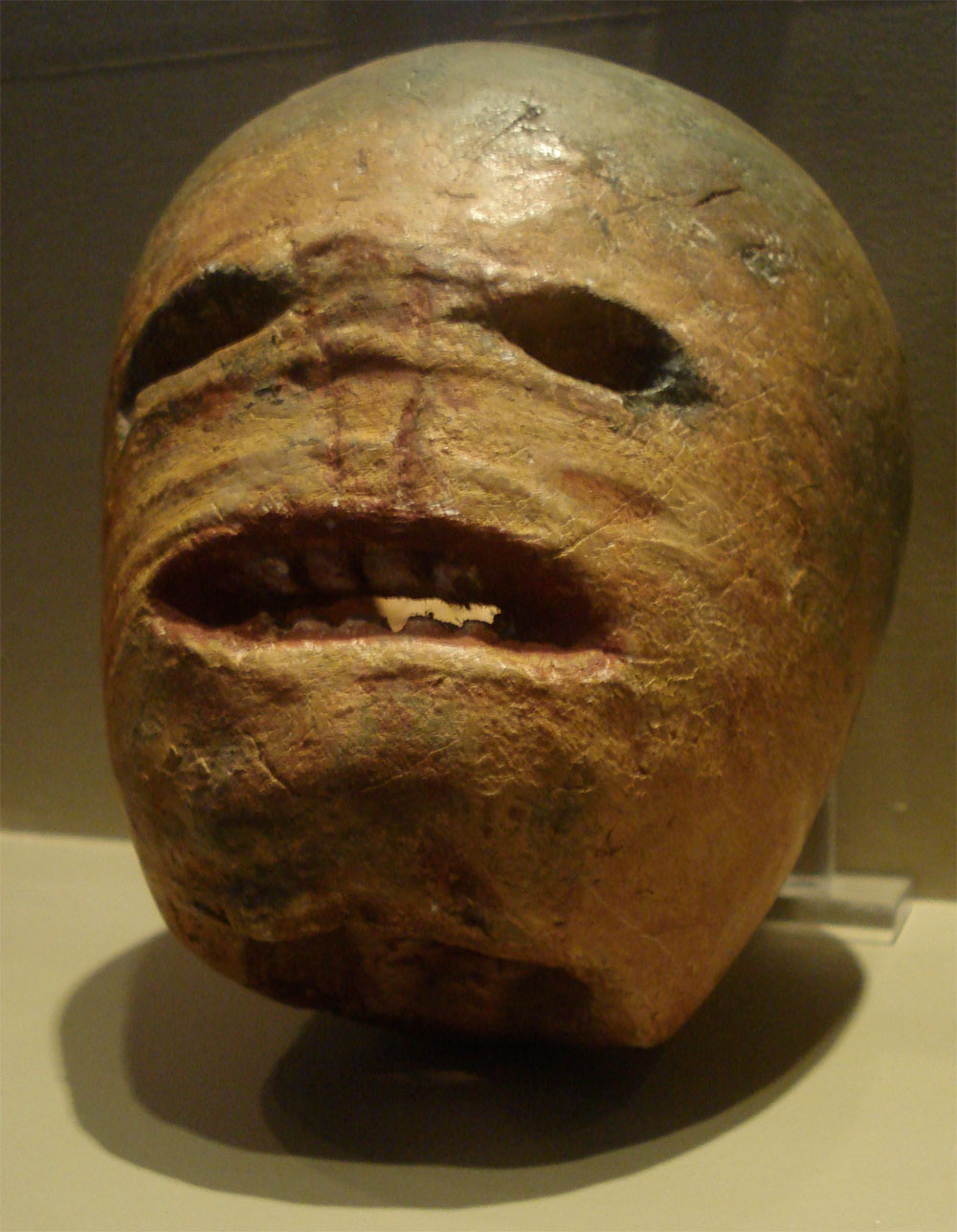
A plaster cast of a traditional Irish Halloween turnip (swede, rutabaga) lantern on display in the Museum of Country Life, Ireland

From at least the 16th century, the festival included guising and mumming in Ireland, Scotland, the Isle of Man and Wales. This involved people going house-to-house in costume (or in disguise), usually reciting verses or songs in exchange for food. Elsewhere in Europe, mumming was part of other festivals, but in the 'Celtic' regions, it was "particularly appropriate to a night upon which supernatural beings were said to be abroad and could be imitated or warded off by human wanderers". Impersonating these beings, or wearing a disguise, was also believed to protect oneself from them. In parts of southern Ireland in the 19th century, the guisers included a hobby horse. A man dressed as a láir bhán (white mare) led youths house-to-house reciting verses – some of which had pagan overtones – in exchange for food. If the household donated food it could expect good fortune from the 'Muck Olla'; not doing so would bring misfortune. In Scotland, youths went house-to-house with masked, painted or blackened faces, often threatening to do mischief if they were not welcomed. F. Marian McNeill suggests the ancient festival included people in costume representing the spirits, and that faces were marked or blackened with ashes from the sacred bonfire. In parts of Wales, men went about dressed as fearsome beings called gwrachod (hags). In the late 19th and early 20th century, young people in Glamorgan and Orkney cross-dressed.

From at least the 18th century, "imitating malignant spirits" led to playing pranks in Ireland and the Scottish Highlands. Wearing costumes and playing pranks at Halloween did not spread to England until the 20th century. Guisers and pranksters used hollowed-out turnips or mangel wurzels as lanterns, often carved with grotesque faces. The lanterns were variously said to represent or to ward off evil spirits and goblins. They were common in parts of Ireland and the Scottish Highlands in the 19th century, as well as in Somerset (see Punkie Night). In the 20th century they spread to other parts of Britain and became generally known as "jack-o'-lanterns" in England and "tumshie lanterns" or "neepie lanterns" in Scotland.

=== Spread to North America ===
Attracting over 2 million spectators, the annual NYC Halloween Parade in Greenwich Village, Manhattan, is the world's largest nighttime parade and Halloween celebration, with its roots in New York's gay culture.

Lesley Bannatyne and Cindy Ott write that Anglican colonists in the southern United States and Catholic colonists in Maryland "recognized All Hallows' Eve in their church calendars", although the Puritans of New England strongly opposed the holiday, along with other traditional celebrations of the established Church, including Christmas. Almanacs of the late 18th and early 19th century give no indication that Halloween was widely celebrated in North America.

It was not until after mass Irish and Scottish immigration in the 19th century that Halloween became a major holiday in North America. Most North American Halloween traditions were inherited from the Irish and Scots, though "In Cajun areas, a nocturnal Mass was said in cemeteries on Halloween night. Candles that had been blessed were placed on graves, and families sometimes spent the entire night at the graveside". Originally confined to these immigrant communities, it was gradually assimilated into mainstream society and was celebrated coast to coast by people of all social, racial, and religious backgrounds by the early 20th century. Then, through American influence, these Halloween traditions spread to many other countries by the late 20th and early 21st century, including to mainland Europe and some parts of the Far East.

The annual New York's Village Halloween Parade in the Greenwich Village (or West Village) neighborhood of Lower Manhattan began in 1974, with its roots in New York's queer culture; it is the world's largest Halloween celebration and America's only major nighttime parade, attracting over two million spectators, many tens of thousands of costumed participants, and a worldwide television audience.

== Symbols ==
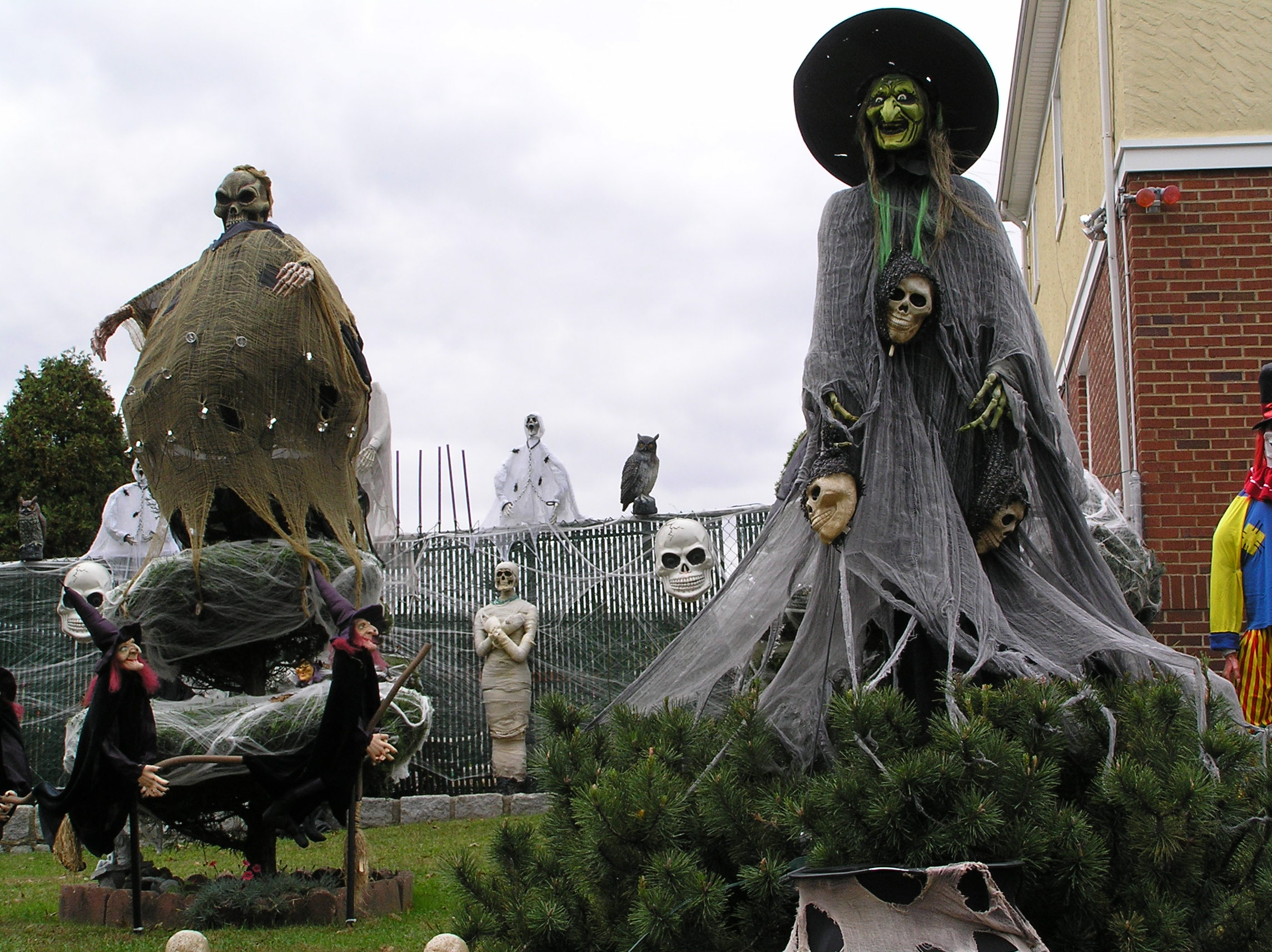
At Halloween, yards, public spaces, and some houses may be decorated with traditionally macabre symbols including skeletons, ghosts, cobwebs, headstones, witches and scarecrows

Jack-o'-lanterns are traditionally carried by guisers on All Hallows' Eve in order to frighten evil spirits. There is a popular Irish Christian folktale associated with the jack-o'-lantern, which in folklore is said to represent a "soul who has been denied entry into both heaven and hell":

On route home after a night's drinking, Jack encounters the Devil and tricks him into climbing a tree. A quick-thinking Jack etches the sign of the cross into the bark, thus trapping the Devil. Jack strikes a bargain that Satan can never claim his soul. After a life of sin, drink, and mendacity, Jack is refused entry to heaven when he dies. Keeping his promise, the Devil refuses to let Jack into hell and throws a live coal straight from the fires of hell at him. It was a cold night, so Jack places the coal in a hollowed out turnip to stop it from going out, since which time Jack and his lantern have been roaming looking for a place to rest.

In Ireland, Scotland, and Northern England the turnip has traditionally been carved during Halloween, but immigrants to North America used the native pumpkin, which is both much softer and much larger, making it easier to carve than a turnip. The American tradition of carving pumpkins is recorded by 1837.

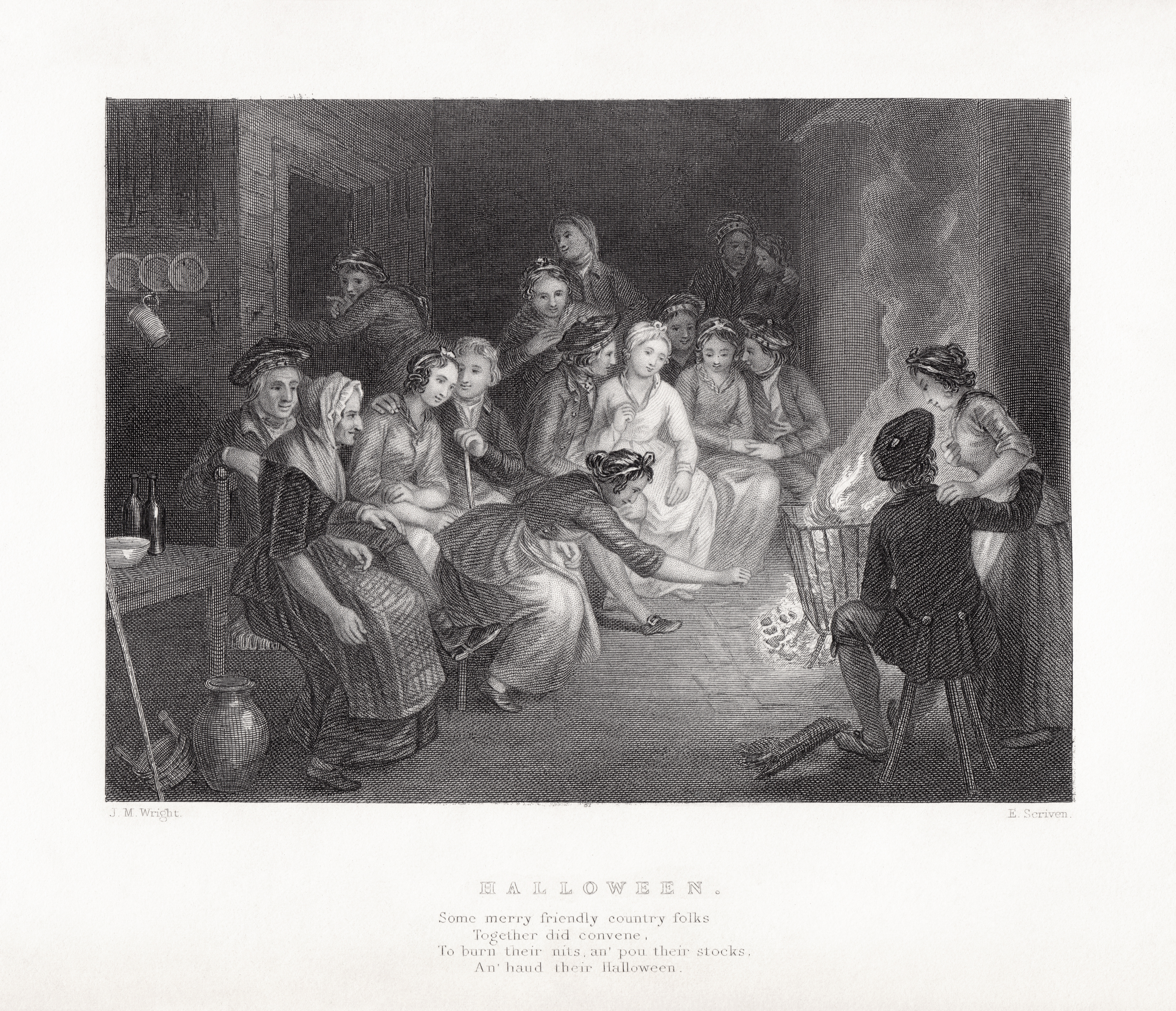
"Halloween" (1785) by Scottish poet Robert Burns, recounts various legends of the holiday.

The modern imagery of Halloween comes from many sources, including Christian eschatology, national customs, works of Gothic and horror literature (such as the novels Frankenstein; or, The Modern Prometheus and Dracula) and classic horror films such as Frankenstein (1931) and Night of the Living Dead (1968). Imagery of the skull, a reference to Golgotha in the Christian tradition, serves as "a reminder of death and the transitory quality of human life" and is consequently found in memento mori and vanitas compositions. Traditionally, the back walls of churches are "decorated with a depiction of the Last Judgment, complete with graves opening and the dead rising, with a heaven filled with angels and a hell filled with devils", a motif that has permeated the observance of this triduum. One of the earliest works on the subject of Halloween is from Scottish poet John Mayne, who, in 1780, made note of pranks at Halloween—"What fearfu' pranks ensue!", as well as the supernatural associated with the night, "bogles" (ghosts)—influencing Robert Burns' "Halloween" (1785). Halloween imagery includes themes of death, evil, and mythical monsters. Black cats, which have been long associated with witches, are also a common symbol of Halloween. Black, orange, and sometimes purple are Halloween's traditional colors.

== Trick-or-treating and guising ==
The practice is said to have roots in the medieval practice of mumming, which is closely related to souling. Mumming practiced in Germany, Scandinavia and other parts of Europe, involved masked persons in fancy dress who "paraded the streets and entered houses to dance or play dice in silence". In the Philippines, the practice of souling is called Pangangaluluwa and is practiced on All Hallows' Eve among children in rural areas. People drape themselves in white cloths to represent souls and then visit houses, where they sing in return for prayers and sweets.

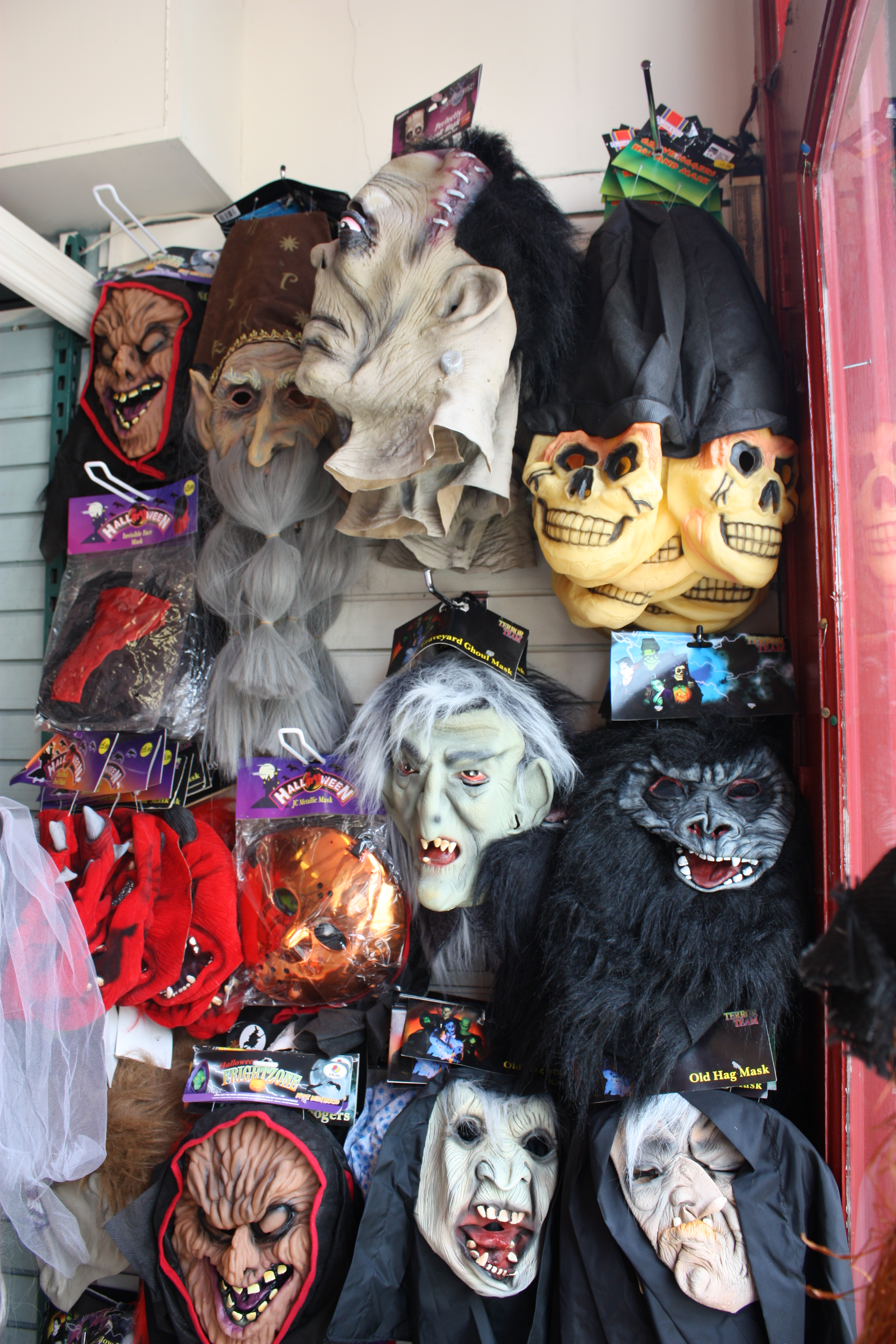
Halloween shop in Derry, Northern Ireland, selling masks ('false faces')

In Scotland and Ireland, guising—children disguised in costume going from door to door for food or coins—is a secular Halloween custom. In Ireland, the most popular phrase for kids to shout (until the 2000s) was "Help the Halloween Party". In Ireland and Scotland, the masks are known as 'false faces', a term recorded in Ayr, Scotland in 1890 by a Scot describing guisers:

I had mind it was Halloween ... the wee callans (boys) were at it already, rinning aboot wi' their fause-faces (false faces) on and their bits o' turnip lanthrons (lanterns) in their haun (hand).

Author Nicholas Rogers cites an early example of guising in North America in 1911, where a newspaper in Kingston, Ontario, Canada, reported children going "guising" around the neighborhood. The earliest known use in print of the term "trick or treat" appears in 1917, in The Sault Daily Star, of Sault Ste. Marie, Ontario, Canada.

American historian and author Ruth Edna Kelley published The Book of Hallowe'en in 1919, and references souling in the chapter "Hallowe'en in America". In her book, Kelley touches on customs that arrived from across the Atlantic; "Americans have fostered them, and are making this an occasion something like what it must have been in its best days overseas. All Halloween customs in the United States are borrowed directly or adapted from those of other countries". The thousands of Halloween postcards produced between the turn of the 20th century and the 1920s commonly show children but not trick-or-treating, and it does not seem to have become a widespread practice in North America until the 1930s, with the first US appearances of the term in 1934, and the first use in a national publication occurring in 1939.

Trunk-or-treating, a popular variant in church or school settings, involves children in costume going to open vehicles in a parking lot in a similar manner to trick-or-treating. In a trunk-or-treat event, the trunk of each vehicle is decorated with a certain theme, such as those of children's literature, movies, scripture, and job roles. Trunk-or-treating has grown in popularity due to its perception as being more safe than going door to door, as well as the fact that it allows for spaced-out rural communities to consolidate further and minimize walking distance.

== Costumes ==
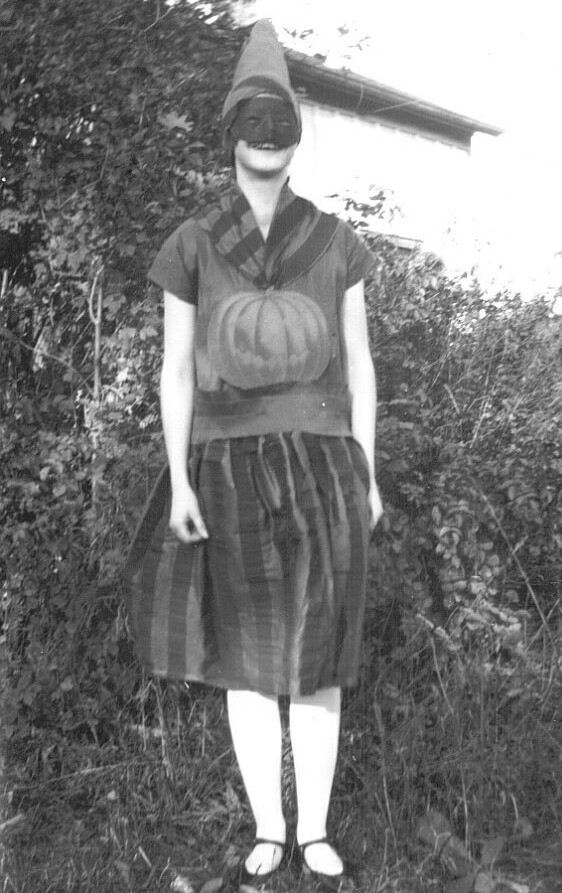
Girl in a Halloween costume in 1928, Ontario, Canada

Dressing up in costumes and going "guising" was prevalent in Scotland and Ireland at Halloween by the late 19th century.

Eddie J. Smith, in his book Halloween, Hallowed is Thy Name, offers a religious perspective to the wearing of costumes on All Hallows' Eve, suggesting that by dressing up as creatures "who at one time caused us to fear and tremble", people are able to poke fun at Satan "whose kingdom has been plundered by our Saviour". Images of skeletons and the dead are traditional decorations used as memento mori.

"Trick-or-Treat for UNICEF" is a fundraising program to support UNICEF, a United Nations Programme that provides humanitarian aid to children in developing countries. Started as a local event in a Northeast Philadelphia neighborhood in 1950 and expanded nationally in 1952, the program involves the distribution of small boxes by schools (or in modern times, corporate sponsors like Hallmark, at their licensed stores) to trick-or-treaters, in which they can solicit small-change donations from the houses they visit. It is estimated that children have collected more than $118 million for UNICEF since its inception. In Canada, in 2006, UNICEF decided to discontinue their Halloween collection boxes, citing safety and administrative concerns; after consultation with schools, they instead redesigned the program.

Since the late 2010s, ethnic stereotypes as costumes have increasingly come under scrutiny in the United States.

=== Pet costumes ===
According to a 2018 report from the National Retail Federation, 30 million Americans spent an estimated $480 million on Halloween costumes for their pets in 2018. This is up from an estimated $200 million in 2010. The most popular pet costumes are the pumpkin, followed by the hot dog, and the bumblebee in third place. The figure rose to approximately $700 million in 2023. According to The Times in the UK, demand for animal costumes among British pet owners in the run up to Halloween in 2025 saw an almost 50% increase from 2024.

== Games and other activities ==
There are several games traditionally associated with Halloween. Some of these games originated as divination rituals or ways of foretelling one's future, especially regarding death, marriage and children. During the Middle Ages, these rituals were done by a "rare few" in rural communities as they were considered to be "deadly serious" practices. In recent centuries, these divination games have been "a common feature of the household festivities" in Ireland and Britain. They often involve apples and hazelnuts. In Celtic mythology, apples were strongly associated with the Otherworld and immortality, while hazelnuts were associated with divine wisdom. Tamanna Nangia also suggests that they derive from Roman practices in celebration of Pomona.

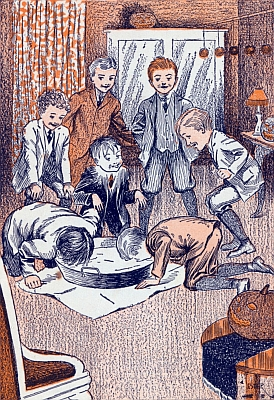
Children bobbing for apples at Hallowe'en

The following activities were a common feature of Halloween in Ireland and Britain during the 17th–20th centuries. Some have become more widespread and continue to be popular today. One common game is apple bobbing or dunking (which may be called "dooking" in Scotland) in which apples float in a tub or a large basin of water and the participants must use only their teeth to remove an apple from the basin. Variants of dunking involve kneeling on a chair, holding a fork between the teeth and trying to drive the fork into an apple, or embedding a coin in the apple which participants had to remove with their teeth. Another common game involves hanging up treacle or syrup-coated scones by strings; these must be eaten without using hands while they remain attached to the string, an activity that inevitably leads to a sticky face. A similar game involved hanging an apple from a string with a coin embedded; the coin had to be removed without using hands. Another once-popular game involves hanging a small wooden rod from the ceiling at head height, with a lit candle on one end and an apple hanging from the other. The rod is spun round, and everyone takes turns to try to catch the apple with their teeth.

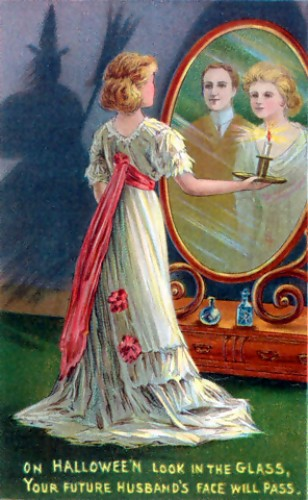
In this 1904 Halloween greeting card, divination is depicted: the young woman, looking into a mirror in a darkened room, hopes to catch a glimpse of her future husband.

Many different types of divination rituals were historically used to predict the future, usually with the goal of foretelling one's future partner or spouse. One secondary source (non-exhaustively) lists nearly twenty separate methods that were at least occasionally practiced on Halloween in Britain and Ireland. Methods could vary wildly and sometimes used unusual substances like molten lead or trails left by snails. Many of these rituals, however, are also reported to have occurred on other special days throughout the year, such as Midsummer. A selection of popular divination methods is displayed below:

- An apple would be peeled in one long strip, then the peel tossed over the shoulder. The peel is believed to land in the shape of the first letter of the future spouse's name.
- Two hazelnuts would be roasted near a fire; one named for the person roasting them and the other for the person they desire. If the nuts jump away from the heat, it is a bad sign, but if the nuts roast quietly it foretells a good match.
- A salty oatmeal bannock would be baked; the person would eat it in three bites and then go to bed in silence without anything to drink. This is said to result in a dream in which their future spouse offers them a drink to quench their thirst.
- Unmarried women were told that if they sat in a darkened room and gazed into a mirror on Halloween night, the face of their future husband would appear in the mirror. The custom was widespread enough to be commemorated on greeting cards from the late 19th century and early 20th century.
- A popular Irish game was known as púicíní ("blindfolds"); a person would be blindfolded and then would choose between several saucers. The item in the saucer would provide a hint as to their future: a ring would mean that they would marry soon; clay, that they would die soon, perhaps within the year; water, that they would emigrate; rosary beads, that they would take Holy Orders (become a nun, priest, monk, etc.); a coin, that they would become rich; a bean, that they would be poor. The game features prominently in the James Joyce short story "Clay" (1914).

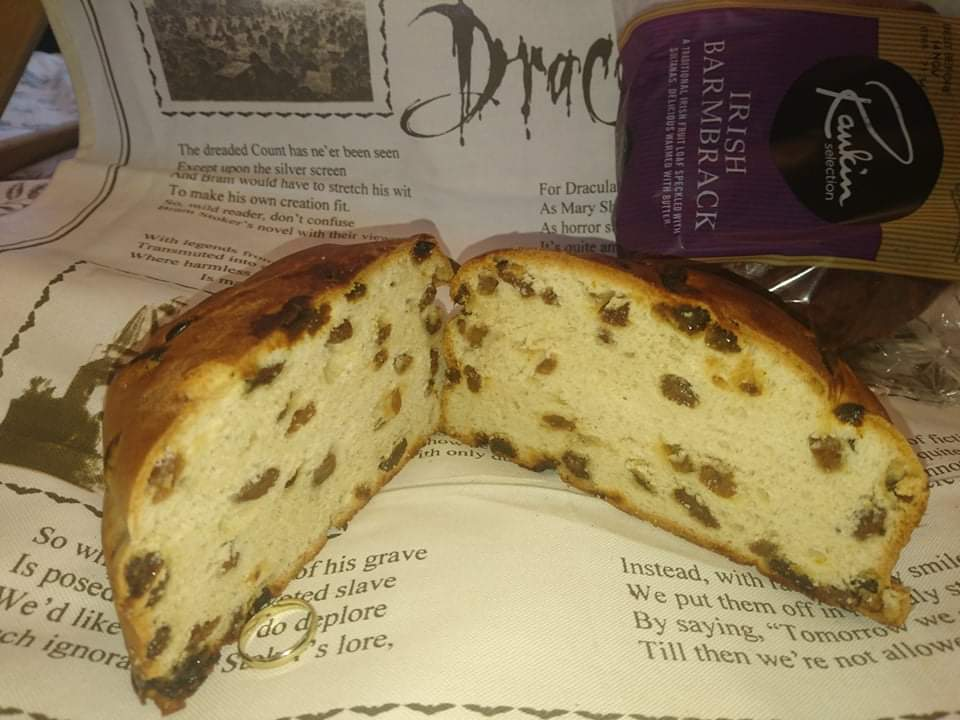
Barmbrack, with a ring found inside, at Halloween in Ireland in 2020

- Items would be hidden in food – usually a cake, barmbrack, cranachan, champ or colcannon – and portions of it served out at random. A person's future would be foretold by the item they happened to find; for example, a ring meant marriage and a coin meant wealth.
- Bonfires were also used in parts of Scotland, Wales and Brittany. When the fire died down, a ring of stones would be laid in the ashes, one for each person. In the morning, if any stone was mislaid it was said that the person it represented would not live out the year. Similarly, in Mexico, children create altars to invite the spirits of deceased children to return (angelitos).
- Three dishes would be placed out; one with clean water, one with dirty water, and one left empty. A blindfolded person would then dip their hand at random into one of the dishes. If they touched the clean water, they were destined to marry a virgin; if the dirty water, then a widow; and if the empty dish, then they would not marry at all. Along with several other divination methods, the use of three dishes is mentioned in Scottish poet Robert Burns's poem "Halloween" (1785):

In order, on the clean hearth-stane,
The luggies [dishes] three are ranged;
And ev'ry time great care is taen [taken],
To see them duly changed [carefully mixed-up]:
Auld uncle John, wha [who] wedlock's joys
Sin' Mar's-year [since 1785] did desire,
Because he gat [got] the toom [empty] dish thrice,
He heav'd them on the fire
In wrath that night.

Nowadays, telling ghost stories, listening to Halloween-themed songs and watching horror films are common fixtures of Halloween parties. Episodes of television series and Halloween-themed specials (with the specials usually aimed at children) are commonly aired on or before Halloween, while new horror films are often released before Halloween to take advantage of the holiday.

== Haunted attractions ==
Haunted attractions are entertainment venues designed to thrill and scare patrons. Most attractions are seasonal Halloween businesses that may include haunted houses, corn mazes, and hayrides, and the level of sophistication of the effects has risen as the industry has grown.

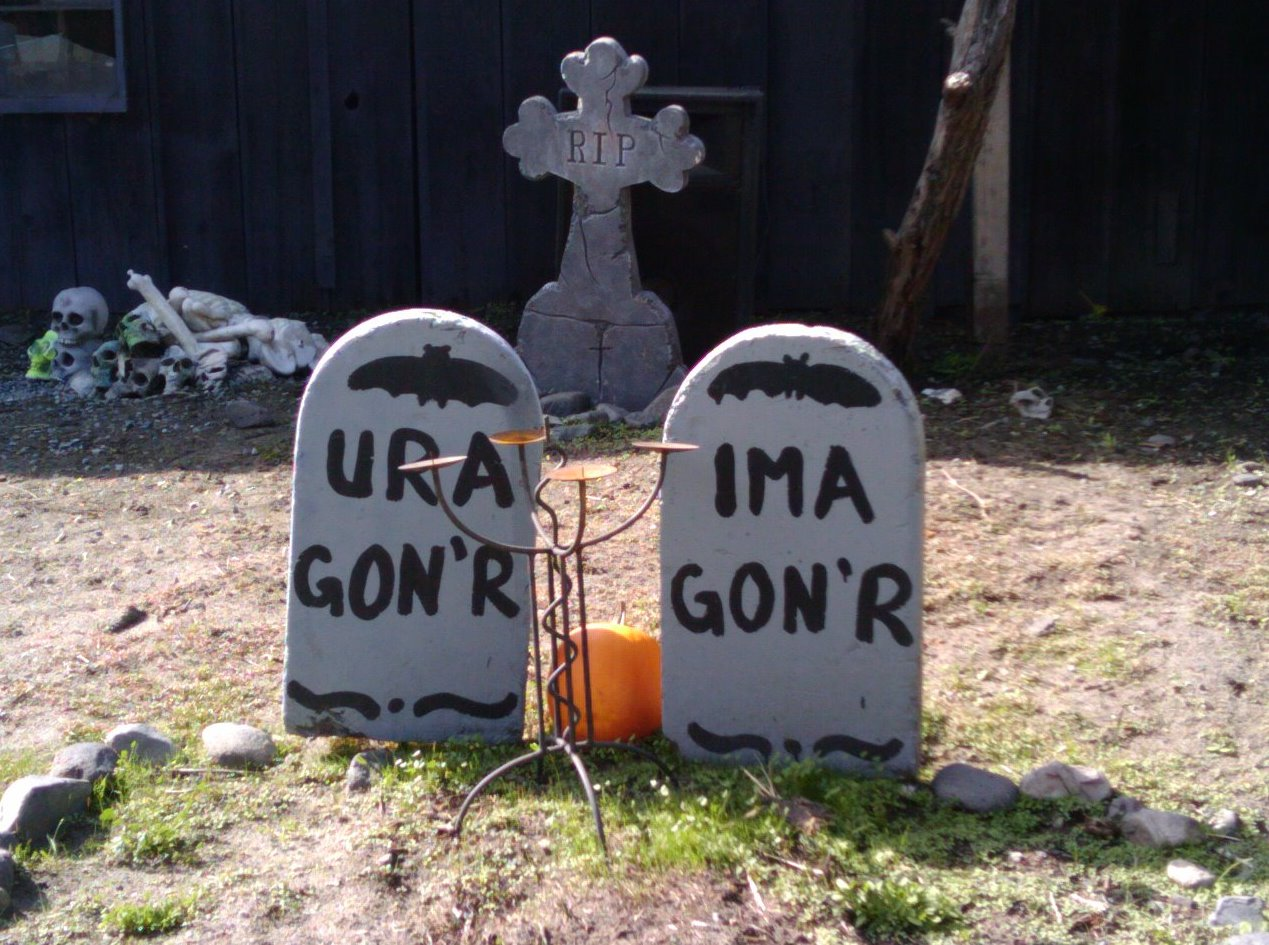
Humorous tombstones in front of a house in California

The first recorded purpose-built haunted attraction was the Orton & Spooner Ghost House, which opened in 1915 in Liphook, England. This attraction actually most closely resembles a carnival fun house, powered by steam. Its antecedent is the Chamber of Horrors, an early attraction from Madame Tussauds in 19th-century London, where waxworks of decapitated figures were on show.

During the 1930s, haunted houses began in the United States. By the 1957s haunted houses began to be major attractions such as one sponsored by the Children's Health Home Junior Auxiliary in San Mateo, California.

The haunted house as an American cultural icon can be attributed to the opening of The Haunted Mansion in Disneyland on 12 August 1969. Knott's Berry Farm began hosting its own Halloween night attraction, Knott's Scary Farm, which opened in 1973. Evangelical Christians adopted a form of these attractions by opening one of the first hell houses in 1972.

The first Halloween haunted house run by a nonprofit organization was produced in 1970 by the Sycamore-Deer Park Jaycees in Clifton, Ohio. It was cosponsored by WSAI, an AM radio station broadcasting out of Cincinnati, Ohio. It was last produced in 1982. Other Jaycees followed suit with their own versions after the success of the Ohio house. The March of Dimes copyrighted a "Mini haunted house for the March of Dimes" in 1976 and began fundraising through their local chapters by conducting haunted houses soon after. Although they apparently quit supporting this type of event nationally sometime in the 1980s, some March of Dimes haunted houses have persisted until today.

On the evening of 11 May 1984, in Jackson Township, New Jersey, the Haunted Castle at Six Flags Great Adventure caught fire. As a result of the fire, eight teenagers perished. The backlash to the tragedy was a tightening of regulations relating to safety, building codes and the frequency of inspections of attractions nationwide. The smaller venues, especially the nonprofit attractions, were unable to compete financially, and the better funded commercial enterprises filled the vacuum. Facilities that were once able to avoid regulation because they were considered to be temporary installations now had to adhere to the stricter codes required of permanent attractions.

In the late 1980s and early 1990s, theme parks became a notable figure in the Halloween business. Six Flags Fright Fest began in 1986 and Universal Studios Florida began Halloween Horror Nights in 1991. Knott's Scary Farm experienced a surge in attendance in the 1990s as a result of America's obsession with Halloween as a cultural event. Theme parks have played a major role in globalizing the holiday. Universal Studios Singapore and Universal Studios Japan both participate, while Disney now mounts Mickey's Not-So-Scary Halloween Party events at its parks in Paris, Hong Kong and Tokyo, as well as in the United States. The theme park haunts are by far the largest, both in scale and attendance.

== Food ==
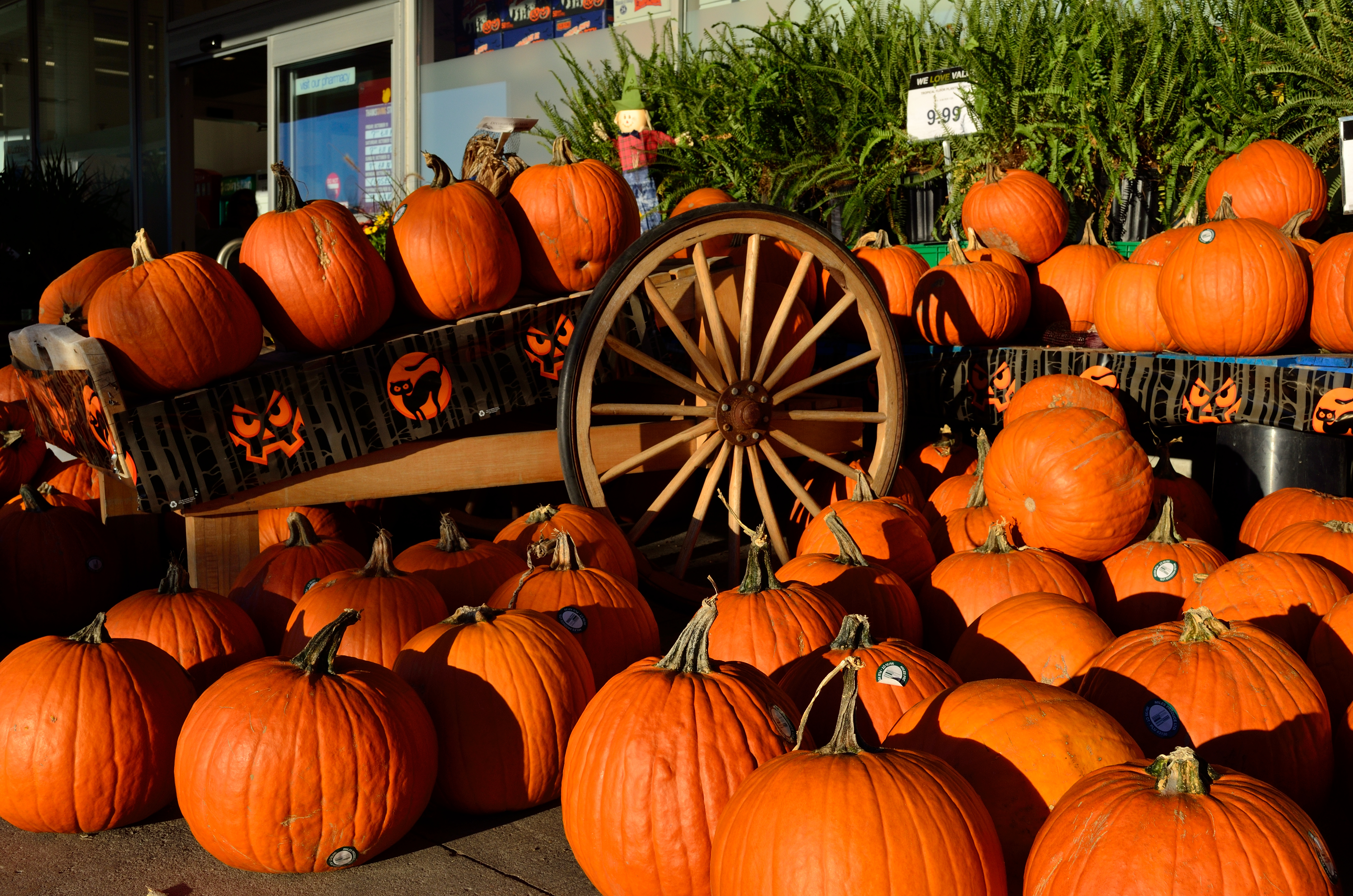
Pumpkins for sale during Halloween

On All Hallows' Eve, many Western Christian denominations encourage abstinence from meat, giving rise to a variety of vegetarian foods associated with this day.

Because in the Northern Hemisphere Halloween comes in the wake of the yearly apple harvest, candy apples are common Halloween treats made by rolling whole apples in a sticky sugar syrup or caramel, sometimes followed by rolling them in nuts.

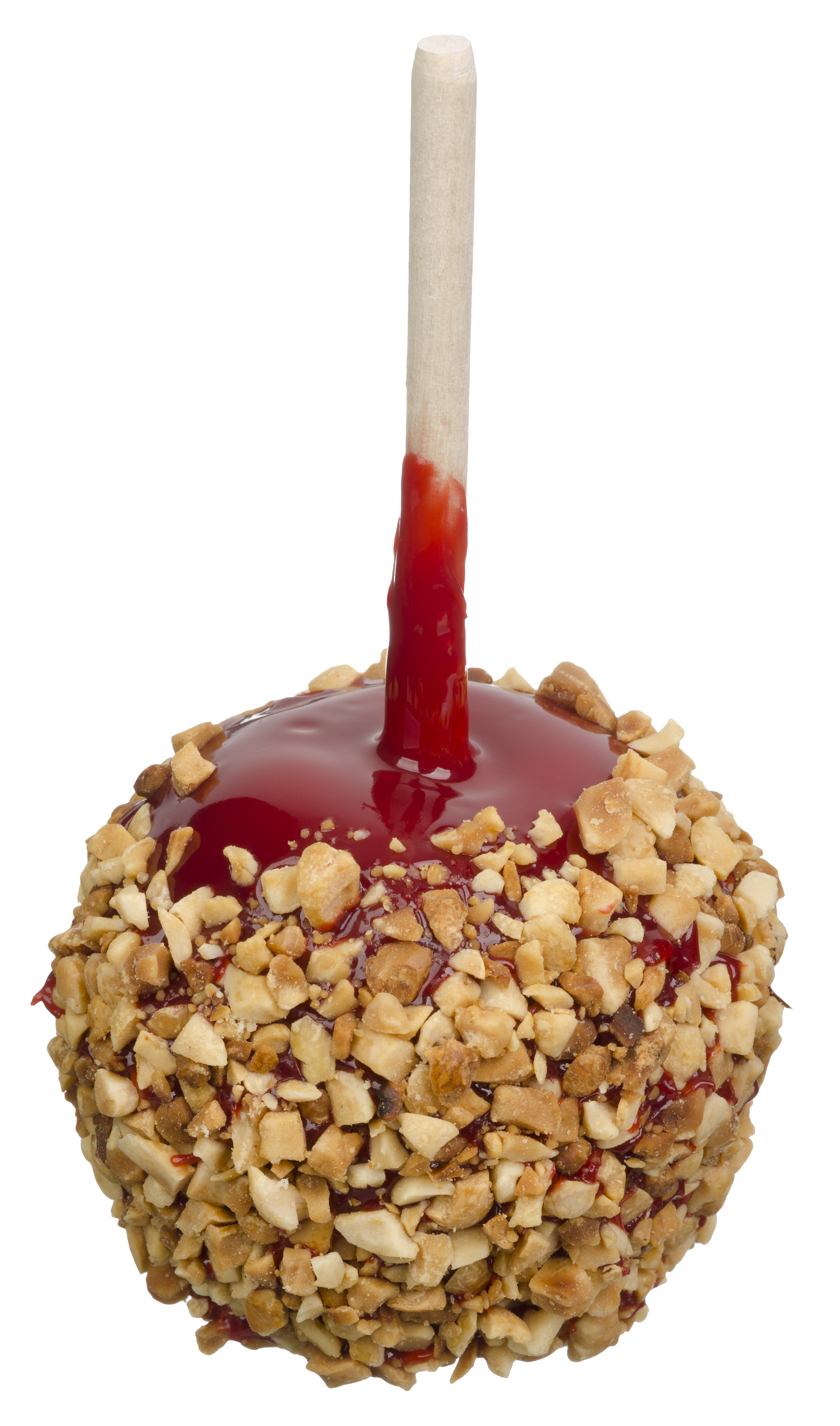
A candy apple

At one time, candy apples were commonly given to trick-or-treating children, but the practice rapidly waned in the wake of widespread rumors that some individuals were embedding items like pins and razor blades in the apples in the United States. While there is evidence of such incidents, relative to the degree of reporting of such cases, actual cases involving malicious acts are extremely rare and have never resulted in serious injury. Nonetheless, many parents assumed that such heinous practices were rampant because of the mass media. At the peak of the hysteria, some hospitals offered free X-rays of children's Halloween hauls in order to find evidence of tampering. Virtually all of the few known candy poisoning incidents involved parents who poisoned their own children's candy.

One custom that persists in modern-day Ireland is the baking (or more often nowadays, the purchase) of a barmbrack (Irish: báirín breac), which is a light fruitcake, into which a plain ring, a coin, and other charms are placed before baking. It is considered fortunate to be the lucky one who finds it. This is similar to the tradition of king cake at the festival of Epiphany. Halloween-themed foods are also produced by companies in the lead up to the night, for example Cadbury releasing Goo Heads (similar to Creme Eggs) in spooky wrapping, and Mr Kipling producing cakes inspired by Roald Dahl's The Witches. Foods such as cakes will often be decorated with Halloween colors (typically black, orange, and purple) and motifs for parties and events. Popular themes include pumpkins, spiders, and body parts.

List of foods associated with Halloween:

- Barmbrack (Ireland)
- Bonfire toffee (Great Britain)
- Candy apples/toffee apples (Great Britain and Ireland)
- Candy apples, candy corn, candy pumpkins (North America)
- Monkey nuts (peanuts in their shells) (Ireland and Scotland)
- Caramel apples
- Caramel corn
- Colcannon (Ireland; see below)
- Sweets/candy/chocolate, often with novelty shapes like skulls, pumpkins, bats, etc.
- Roasted pumpkin seeds
- Roasted sweet corn
- Soul cakes
- Pumpkin pie

== Christian observances ==
Mass is offered in honour of All Hallows at Hedvig Eleonora Evangelical-Lutheran Church in Stockholm, after which a number of worshippers light votive candles to comemmorate Christian martyrs and saints (31 October 2026).

On Hallowe'en (All Hallows' Eve), in Poland, believers were once taught to pray out loud as they walk through the forests in order that the souls of the dead might find comfort; in Spain, Christian priests in tiny villages toll their church bells in order to remind their congregants to remember the dead on All Hallows' Eve. In Ireland, and among immigrants in Canada, a custom includes the Christian practice of abstinence, keeping All Hallows' Eve as a meat-free day and serving pancakes or colcannon instead.

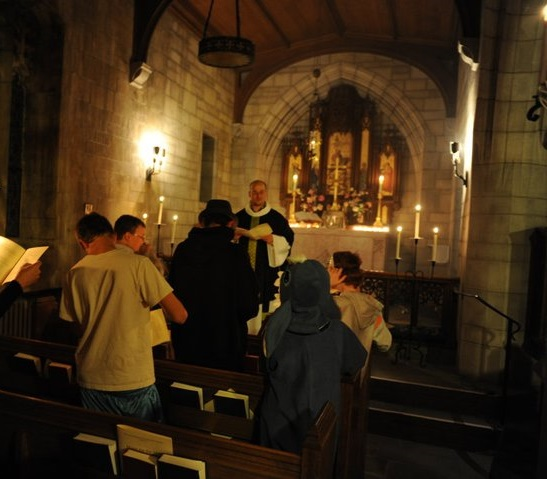
The Vigil of All Hallows is being celebrated at an Episcopal Christian church on Hallowe'en.

The Christian Church traditionally observed Hallowe'en through a vigil. Worshippers prepared themselves for feasting on the following All Saints' Day with prayers and fasting. This church service observed by liturgical Christians on All Hallows' Eve (such as Roman Catholics and Evangelical-Lutherans) is known as the Vigil of All Hallows Day or the Vigil of All Saints Day. After the service, "suitable festivities and entertainments" often follow, as well as a visit to the graveyard or cemetery, where flowers and candles are often placed in preparation for All Hallows' Day. In England, Light Parties are organized by churches after worship services on Halloween with the focus on Jesus as the Light of the World. In Sweden, where the Evangelical-Lutheran branch of Christianity is the dominant faith, a number of people visit the cemeteries on All Hallows' Eve to light votive candles there. Across Europe, "crowds" of Christians are seen visiting cemeteries during Allhallowtide, "decorating the graves of their dear ones with flowers, tending the lawn, and spreading fresh white gravel around the tombs" with "candles, protected by little glass lanterns" being "placed around the graves or at the foot of the tombstones, to be lighted on All Saints' eve and left burning through the night". The use of candles by Christians symbolized the light of Christ and the use of lamps at the tombs of Christian martyrs dates back to the early Christian period. At cemeteries in both Spain and France, as well as in Latin America, priests lead processions and services during Allhallowtide, after which people keep an all-night vigil. In Spain, special pastries called "bones of the holy" (Spanish: huesos de santo) are set on graves.

Today, Christian attitudes towards Halloween are diverse. In the Anglican Church, some dioceses have chosen to emphasize the Christian traditions associated with All Hallows' Eve. Some of these practices include praying, fasting and attending worship services.

O LORD our God, increase, we pray thee, and multiply upon us the gifts of thy grace: that we, who do prevent the glorious festival of all thy Saints, may of thee be enabled joyfully to follow them in all virtuous and godly living. Through Jesus Christ, Our Lord, who liveth and reigneth with thee, in the unity of the Holy Ghost, ever one God, world without end. Amen. —Collect of the Vigil of All Saints, The Anglican Breviary

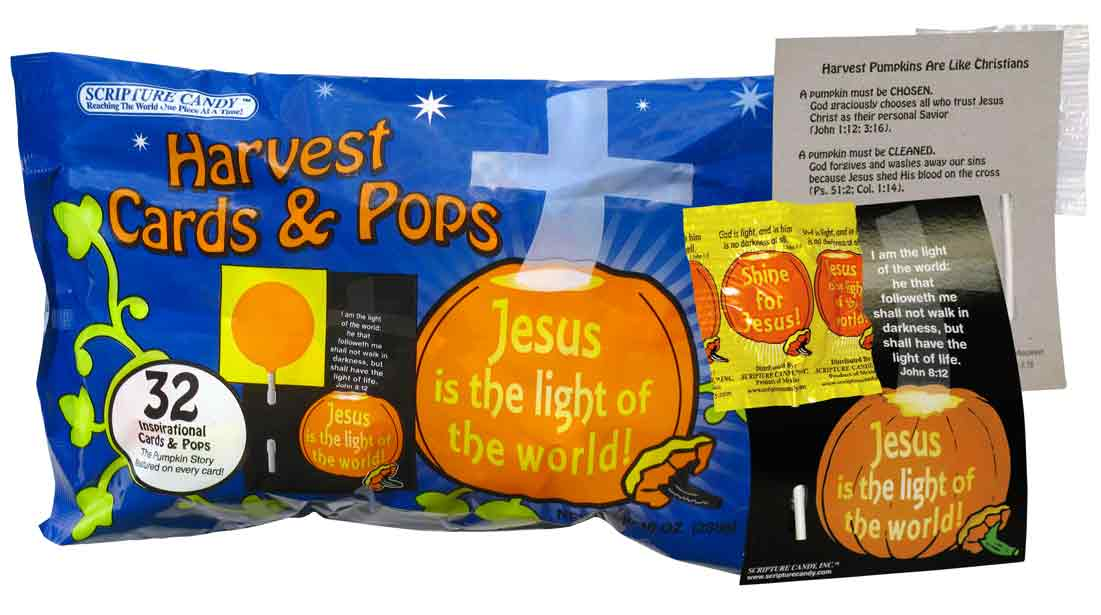
Halloween Scripture Candy with gospel tract

Other Protestant Christians also celebrate All Hallows' Eve as Reformation Day, a day to remember the Protestant Reformation, alongside All Hallows' Eve or independently from it. This is because Martin Luther is said to have nailed his Ninety-five Theses to All Saints' Church in Wittenberg on All Hallows' Eve. Often, "Harvest Festivals", "Hallelujah Night" or "Reformation Festivals" are held on All Hallows' Eve, in which children dress up as Bible characters or Reformers. In addition to distributing candy to children who are trick-or-treating on Hallowe'en, many Christians also provide gospel tracts to them. One organization, the American Tract Society, stated that around 3 million gospel tracts are ordered from them alone for Hallowe'en celebrations. Others order Halloween-themed Scripture Candy to pass out to children on this day.

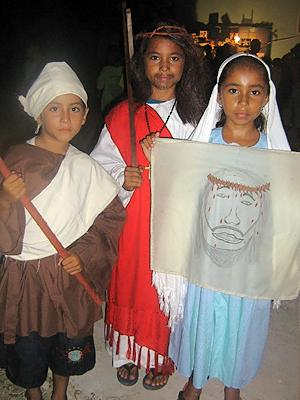
Belizean children dressed up as Biblical figures and Christian saints

Some Christians feel concerned about the modern celebration of Halloween because they feel it trivializes – or celebrates – paganism, the occult, or other practices and cultural phenomena deemed incompatible with their beliefs. Father Gabriele Amorth, an exorcist in Rome, has said, "if English and American children like to dress up as witches and devils on one night of the year that is not a problem. If it is just a game, there is no harm in that." The Catholic Archdiocese of Boston has organized a "Saint Fest" on Halloween. Similarly, many contemporary Protestant churches view Halloween as a fun event for children, holding events in their churches where children and their parents can dress up, play games, and get candy for free. To these Christians, Halloween holds no threat to the spiritual lives of children: being taught about death and mortality, and the ways of the Celtic ancestors actually being a valuable life lesson and a part of many of their parishioners' heritage. Christian minister Sam Portaro wrote that Halloween is about using "humor and ridicule to confront the power of death".

In the Catholic Church, Halloween's Christian connection is acknowledged, and Halloween celebrations are common in many Catholic parochial schools and Lutheran parochial schools, such as in the United States, while schools throughout Ireland close for the Halloween break. A few evangelical churches use "Hell houses" and comic-style tracts in order to make use of Halloween's popularity as an opportunity for evangelism. Others consider Halloween to be completely incompatible with the Christian faith due to its putative origins in the Festival of the Dead celebration. Indeed, even though Eastern Orthodox Christians observe All Hallows' Day on the First Sunday after Pentecost, the Eastern Orthodox Church recommends the observance of Vespers or a Paraklesis on the Western observance of All Hallows' Eve, out of the pastoral need to provide an alternative to popular celebrations.

== Analogous celebrations and perspectives ==
=== Judaism ===
According to Alfred J. Kolatch in the Second Jewish Book of Why, in Judaism, Halloween is not permitted by Jewish Halakha because it violates Leviticus 18:3, which forbids Jews from partaking in Gentile customs. Many Jews observe Yizkor communally four times a year, which is vaguely similar to the observance of Allhallowtide in Christianity, in the sense that prayers are said for both "martyrs and for one's own family". Nevertheless, many American Jews celebrate Halloween, disconnected from its Christian and Pagan origins. Reform Rabbi Jeffrey Goldwasser has said that "There is no religious reason why contemporary Jews should not celebrate Halloween", while Orthodox Rabbi Michael Broyde has argued against Jews' observing the holiday. Purim has sometimes been compared to Halloween, in part due to some observants wearing costumes, especially of Biblical figures described in the Purim narrative.

=== Islam ===
Sheikh Idris Palmer, author of A Brief Illustrated Guide to Understanding Islam, has ruled that Muslims should not participate in Halloween, stating that "participation in Halloween is worse than participation in Christmas, Easter, ... it is more sinful than congratulating the Christians for their prostration to the crucifix". It has also been ruled to be haram by the National Fatwa Council of Malaysia because of its alleged pagan roots stating "Halloween is celebrated using a humorous theme mixed with horror to entertain and resist the spirit of death that influence humans". Dar Al-Ifta Al-Missriyyah disagrees provided the celebration is not referred to as an 'eid' and that behavior remains in line with Islamic principles.

=== Hinduism ===
Hindus remember the dead during the festival of Pitru Paksha, during which Hindus pay homage to and perform a ceremony "to keep the souls of their ancestors at rest". It is celebrated in the Hindu month of Bhadrapada, usually in mid-September. The celebration of the Hindu festival Diwali sometimes conflicts with the date of Halloween; but some Hindus choose to participate in the popular customs of Halloween. Other Hindus, such as Soumya Dasgupta, have opposed the celebration on the grounds that Western holidays like Halloween have "begun to adversely affect our indigenous festivals".

=== Neopaganism ===
There is no consistent rule or view on Halloween amongst those who describe themselves as Neopagans or Wiccans. Some Neopagans do not observe Halloween, but instead observe Samhain on 1 November, some neopagans do enjoy Halloween festivities, stating that one can observe both "the solemnity of Samhain in addition to the fun of Halloween". Some neopagans are opposed to the celebration of Hallowe'en, stating that it "trivializes Samhain", and "avoid Halloween, because of the interruptions from trick or treaters". The Manitoban writes that "Wiccans don't officially celebrate Halloween, despite the fact that 31 October will still have a star beside it in any good Wiccan's day planner. Starting at sundown, Wiccans celebrate a holiday known as Samhain. Samhain actually comes from old Celtic traditions and is not exclusive to Neopagan religions like Wicca. While the traditions of this holiday originate in Celtic countries, modern day Wiccans don't try to historically replicate Samhain celebrations. Some traditional Samhain rituals are still practised, but at its core, the period is treated as a time to celebrate darkness and the dead – a possible reason why Samhain can be confused with Halloween celebrations."

== Geography ==
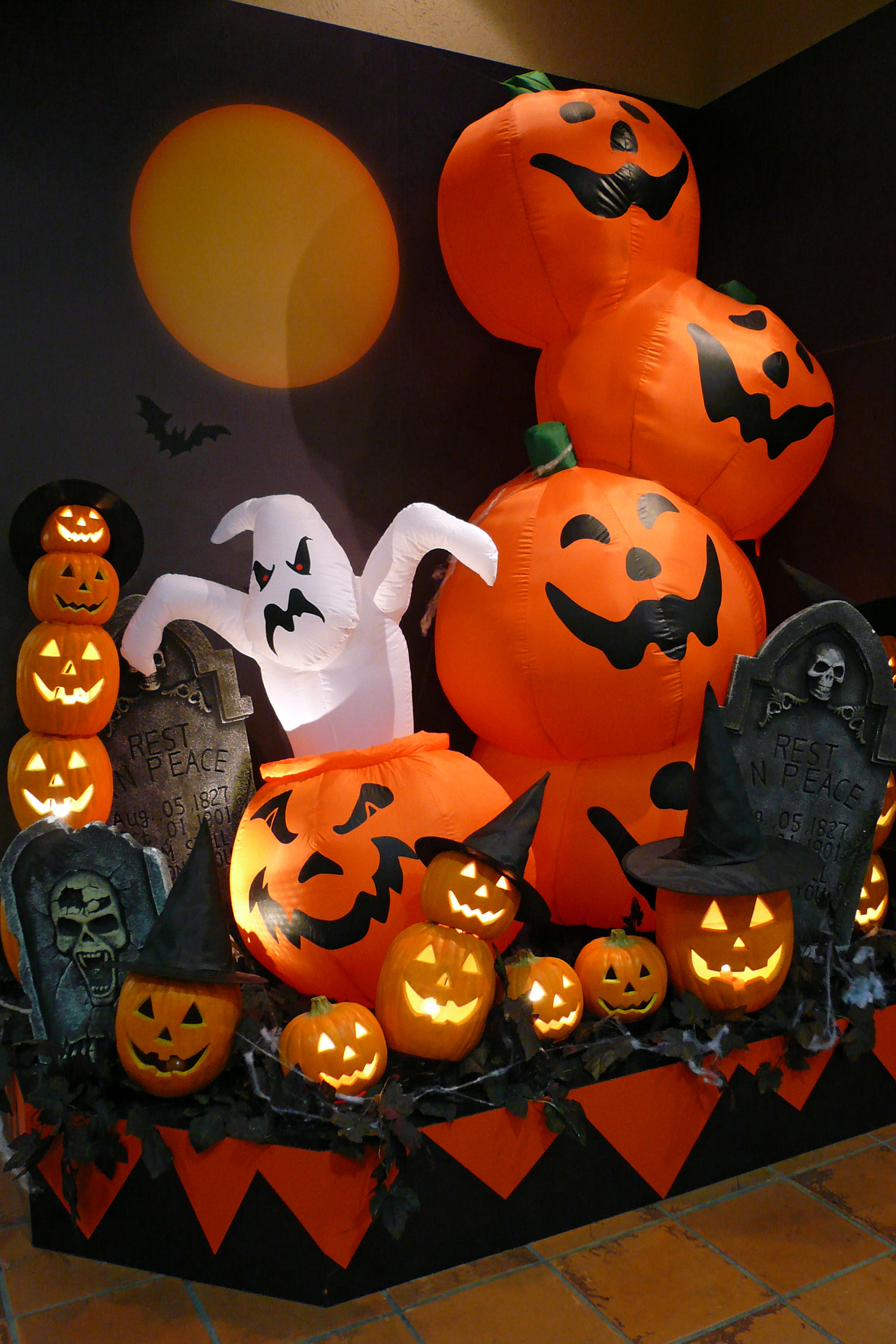
Halloween display in Kobe, Japan

The traditions and importance of Halloween vary greatly among countries that observe it. In Scotland and Ireland, traditional Halloween customs include children dressing up in costume going "guising", holding parties, while other practices in Ireland include lighting bonfires, and having firework displays. In Brittany children would play practical jokes by setting candles inside skulls in graveyards to frighten visitors. Mass transatlantic immigration in the 19th century popularized Halloween in North America, and celebration in the United States and Canada has had a significant impact on how the event is observed in other nations. This larger North American influence, particularly in iconic and commercial elements, has extended to places such as Brazil, Colombia, Ecuador, Chile, Australia, New Zealand, (most) continental Europe, Japan, and other parts of East Asia.

== Cost ==
Halloween decor outside a retail establishment in Queens, New York

In the American economy, Halloween accounts for over $10 billion every year. According to the National Retail Federation, Americans were projected to spend $12.2 billion on Halloween in 2023, up from $10.6 billion in 2022. Of this amount, $3.9 billion is projected to be spent on home decorations, up from $2.7 billion in 2019. The National Retail Federation projects it to increase to $13.5 billion in 2026 with 2025 years record being $13.1 billion. Decorations accounting for $4.3 billion, costumes with a total cost of $4.4 billion, greeting cards costing $0.8 billion, and candy $4.1 billion. The popularity of Halloween decorations has been growing in recent years, with retailers offering a wider range of increasingly elaborate and oversized decorations.

== See also ==
- Campfire story – Form of oral storytelling performed around an open fire at night
- Dziady – Slavic folk holiday
- English festivals
- Ghost Festival – Traditional Buddhist and Taoist festival
- Hop-tu-Naa – Celtic festival celebrated in the Isle of Man
- Kekri – Finnish autumn festival
- List of fiction works about Halloween
- List of films set around Halloween
- List of Halloween television specials
- Martinisingen – Protestant custom in Germany
- Mischief Night – Informal holiday
- Naraka Chaturdashi – Hindu festival
- Neewollah – Annual festival in Independence, Kansas
- Skelly (Halloween decoration) – Skeleton-shaped lawn decoration
- Walpurgis Night – Germanic festival celebrating the start of summer
- Will-o'-the-wisp – Atmospheric ghost lights
