= Skelly (surname) =

Skelly is a surname which is an Anglicised version of the Old Gaelic names O Scolaidhe" or O Scolaire.

Notable people with the surname include:

- Ann Skelly (born 1996), Irish actress
- Bill Skelly, British police officer
- Bob Skelly (1943–2022), Canadian politician from British Columbia
- Brian Skelly (1920–2001) SOE Agent
- Carly Skelly (born 1986), English professional boxer
- Chas Skelly (born 1985), American mixed martial artist
- Donna Skelly (born 1961), Canadian politician from Ontario
- Hal Skelly (1891–1934), American Broadway and film actor
- Jack Skelly (1841–1863), Union soldier in the American Civil War
- James Skelly (born 1980), English musician, singer-songwriter and record producer
- Joseph Morrison Skelly, American historian and columnist
- Katie Skelly (born 1985), American comics artist and illustrator
- Laurence Skelly (born 1961), Member of the House of Keys in the Isle of Man
- Liam Skelly (born 1941), Irish barrister, businessman and politician
- Michael Peter Skelly (born 1961), American businessman and former political candidate
- Ray Skelly (1941–2019), Canadian politician from British Columbia
- Thomas Skelly (1879–?), American football coach
- Tim Skelly (1951–2020), arcade game designer and programmer
- William Skelly (1878–1957), American entrepreneur, founder of Skelly Oil Company
- Joseph P. Skelly (1850–1895), Irish-American composer
