= Skelly (Halloween decoration) =

Skeleton-shaped lawn decoration

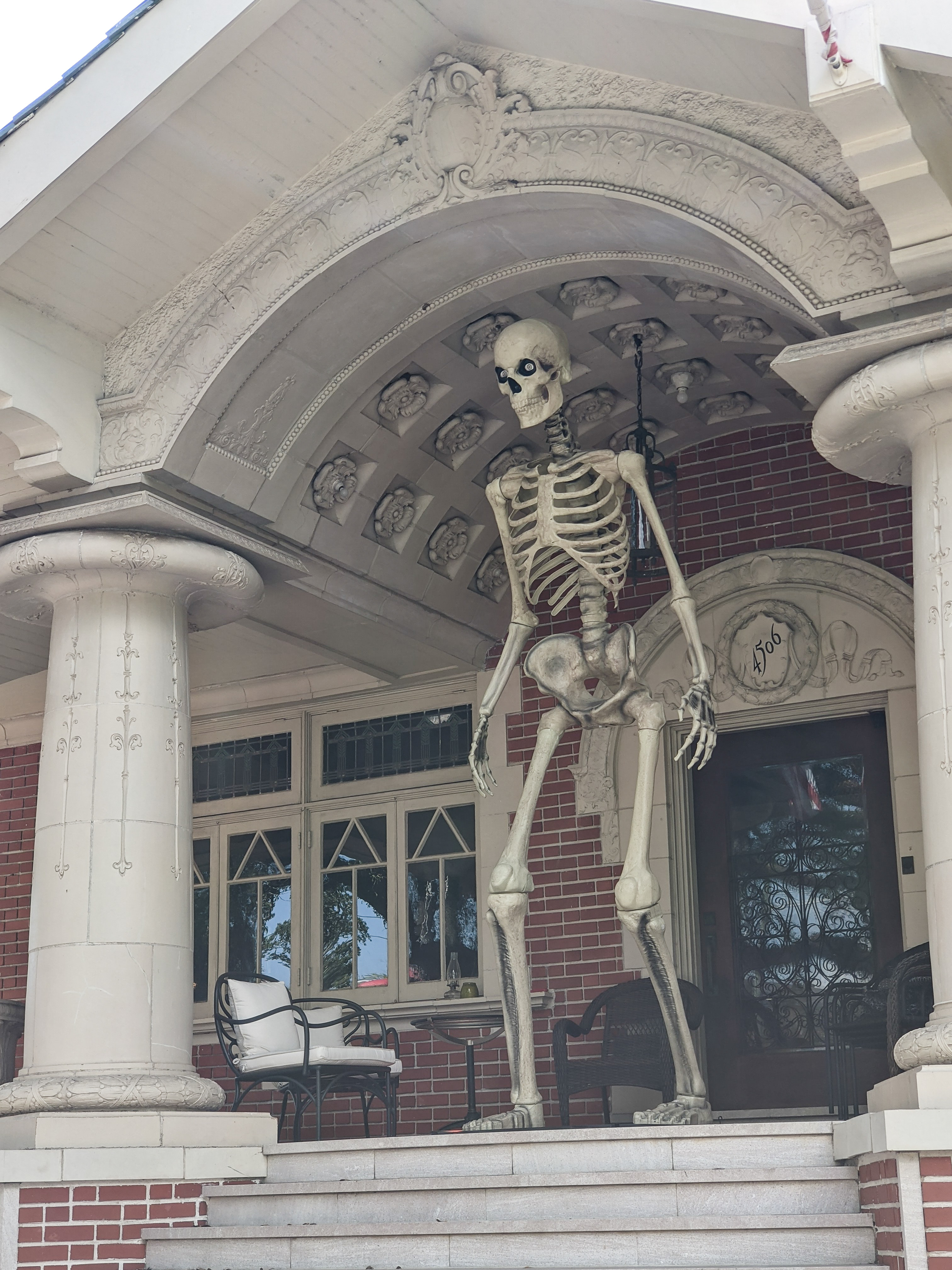
A Skelly decoration in October 2020

12-Foot Giant-Sized Skeleton, colloquially known as Skelly, is a 12-foot-tall skeleton-shaped lawn ornament created by Home Depot for Halloween.

== Description and use ==
The home improvement corporation Home Depot created a 12-foot-tall skeleton lawn decoration made with metal pipe and LED eyes. Listed as "12-Foot Giant-Sized Skeleton" on its website, the skeleton became colloquially known as "Skelly".

Home Depot also produces a 7-foot skeletal dog decoration, called "Skelly's Dog", to serve as a companion decoration.

== Development ==
The lawn decoration was created in Home Depot's research and development department by Lance Allen and Rachel Little. After developing hundreds of skeletons, as a secret project, they set out to create a large skeleton. They did not think that 10 feet would be grand enough, and increased its height to 12 feet, that of a basketball hoop. At that height, they took anatomical liberties to make Skelly appear realistic, such as shortening the neck from appearing too long. Other constraints included a reasonable price and ease of transport home for setup. Allen described their team as being impressed when Skelly was unveiled in a conference room. The skeleton was first released in 2020 and continued to sell through 2023, when it was sold out for the holiday. In 2024, Home Depot created an updated version of Skelly with customizable glowing LED eyes. The eyes feature different pre-set designs that allow it to be used for different holidays aside from just Halloween. Home Depot also released a limited-edition "servo Skelly", an animatronic version of the decoration that uses motors to move.

In response to Skelly's popularity, Home Depot has produced other large Halloween decorations, although none have sold as well as Skelly.

== Reception ==
Skelly has become a very popular product, often being sold out from Home Depot inventories in the Halloween season. Skelly is also popular year-round, and is occasionally used to celebrate other holidays such as Christmas by putting a giant Santa suit on him. Skelly has developed an online fandom, including a Facebook group called the "12 Foot Skeleton Owners Group".

Skelly went viral on social media during the COVID-19 pandemic from consumers showing the skeleton either as it is or in different costume or locations. Examples include showing Skelly with custom clothes, flashy jewelry, and as an accessory in a car. In 2023, owners of Skelly dressed it as Taylor Swift to coincide with her Eras Tour. The hashtag "12footskeleton" had over 89 million views on TikTok by 2023. After its original virality, Skelly continued to feature in parody articles and fan videos. Skelly is also the subject of Internet memes.

Skelly's year-round popularity has caused it to run afoul with homeowner associations in the United States, and owners of it have faced fines for displaying it outside of the Halloween season. There is also a resale market online for used Skellies.

== See also ==
- Skeleton (undead)
- da share z0ne
