= Thomas Skelly =

American football coach

Biographical details
- Born: May 1879; Norwich, Connecticut, U.S.
- Died: Unknown

Playing career

Football
- 1903: Holy Cross

Baseball
- 1900–1903: Holy Cross
- Position: Right fielder

Coaching career (HC unless noted)

Football
- 1904: Marquette

Head coaching record
- Overall: 5–2

Thomas J. Skelly was an American college football coach. Skelly was the fourth head football coach at Marquette University located in Milwaukee and he held that position for the 1904 season. His coaching record at Marquette was 5–2.

Skelly, a native of Norwich, Connecticut, was a graduate of The College of the Holy Cross. There he played football, basketball and baseball, the latter with the position of right fielder, for three years. In the 1903 football season, he had also served as the team's captain.

== Head coaching record ==
Year	Team	Overall	Conference	Standing	Bowl/playoffs
Marquette Blue and Gold (Independent) (1904)
1904	Marquette	5–2			
Marquette:		5–2			
Total:		5–2			
