= Trunk-or-treating =

Halloween tradition

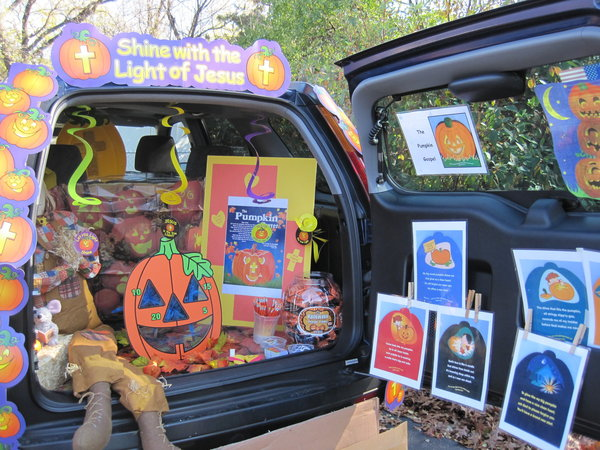
A trunk-or-treating event held at a church in Darien, Illinois, U.S.

Trunk-or-treating is a form of Halloween tradition which often serves as an alternative to trick-or-treating in the United States and Canada. Beginning in the 2000s, it usually involves candy or other treats being handed out of or taken from the trunks of vehicles, typically on Halloween (All Hallow's Eve), although this tradition is also held in the days preceding or following the annual celebration on October 31.

While trunk-or-treating is often promoted as a safer and more convenient alternative to traditional trick-or-treating, particularly in areas with heavy traffic or spread-out housing, urban planning advocates argue it is a symptom of car-dependent infrastructure. Organizations like Strong Towns criticize the practice as a forced compromise, contending that it replaces organic neighborhood interaction with sterilized parking lot gatherings because modern suburban street design has become inherently hostile to pedestrian traditions.

== History ==
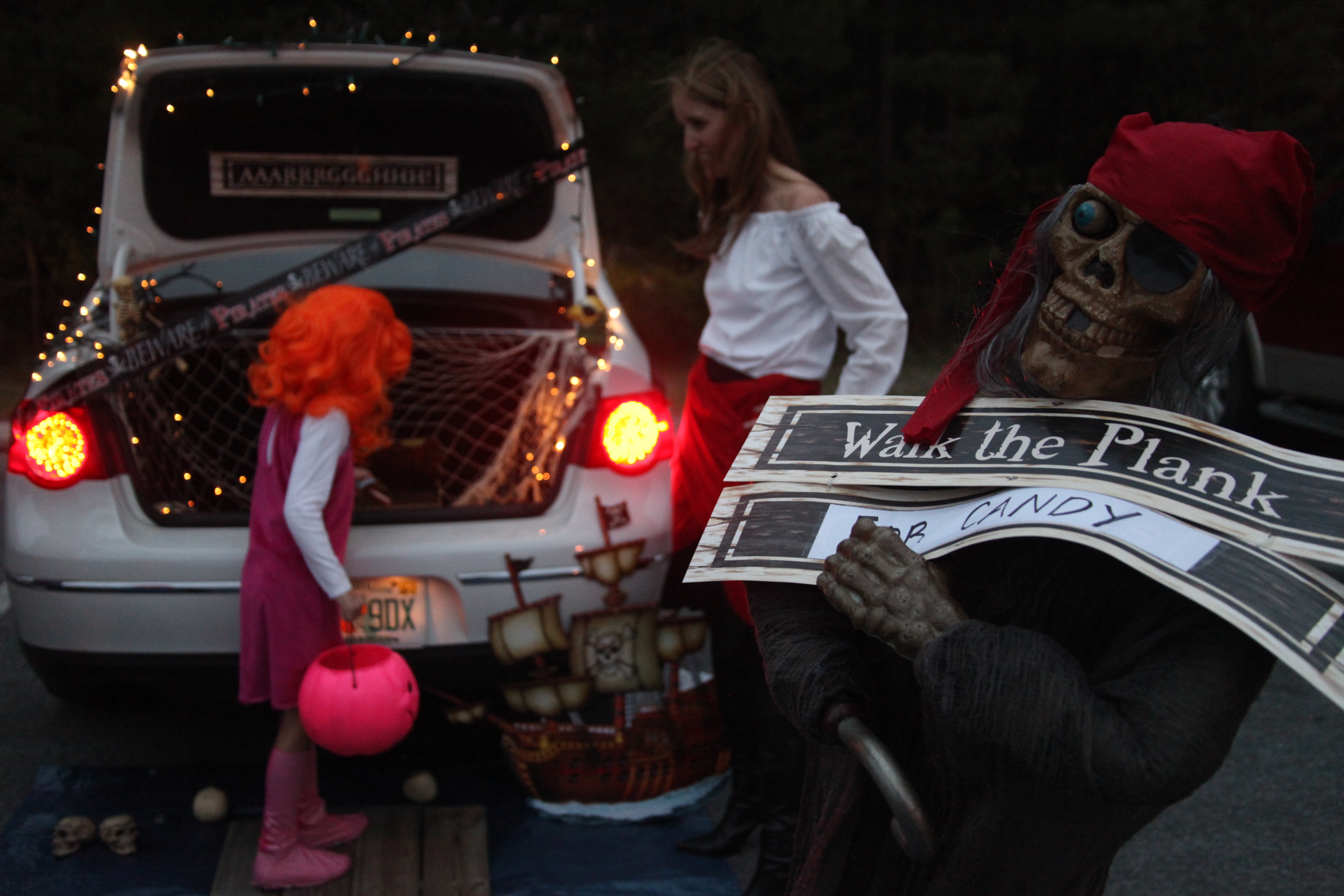
A vehicle involved in trunk-or-treating at the Marine Corps Air Station Cherry Point in the U.S. state of North Carolina

This annual tradition was begun in the 2000s by Christian churches and their associated groups as a "fall festival" for an alternative to tricking-or-treating in churches. (Note: Sources are unclear on when the tradition began. While NPR reports that it began in 1994 in Alabama, this is the only source that mentions the specific year. Other sources, including the HuffPost, state the late 1990s. Therefore, only 1990s is noted as a result of the various reporting on the initial date(s) of when the tradition began.) Though Halloween (All Hallow's Eve) and its religious observances originate in the Christian tradition, being a part of the season of Allhallowtide, certain parents have expressed concern about modern-day revelry in its popular celebration, such as the gore that has become associated with it in the latter part of the 20th century. Additionally, trunk-or-treating avoids street crime or car danger that may be associated with normal trick-or-treating. While trick-or-treating involves going to homes or buildings to receive candy, trunk-or-treating is associated with candy being handed out or served from the trunks of decorated vehicles.

The etiquette of trunk-or-treating has led to the tradition also being called "Halloween tailgating", after the practice of handing out or serving candy from the trunks of vehicles. Trunk-or-treating has become increasingly popular in the 21st century. Some churches and church leaders have seen the popularity of Halloween celebrations as an opportunity for religious and cultural engagement with the gospel.

== Etiquette ==
Trunk-or-treating is typically held on Halloween and Halloween night, although it can also be hosted in the days before or after the annual celebration (cf. Allhallowtide). Trunk-or-treat locations vary, although they are often held at churches or schools, in large parking lots, or at car dealerships. The vehicles that candy is collected from are also usually covered with Halloween decorations. Some other decorations, rather than Halloween decor, are from children's shows, movies, literature, job roles, historical figures, and many more. Sometimes, trunk-or-treat locations can include interactive activities that children can participate in as well.

== See also ==
- Hell house
