= Day of Prayer =

Day of prayer for a specific purpose

A Day of Prayer is a day allocated to prayer, either by leaders of religions or the general public, for a specific purpose. Such days are usually ecumenical in nature, and are usually are treated as commemorative in nature, rather than as actual liturgical feast days or memorials.

== Day of Prayer for Prisoners ==
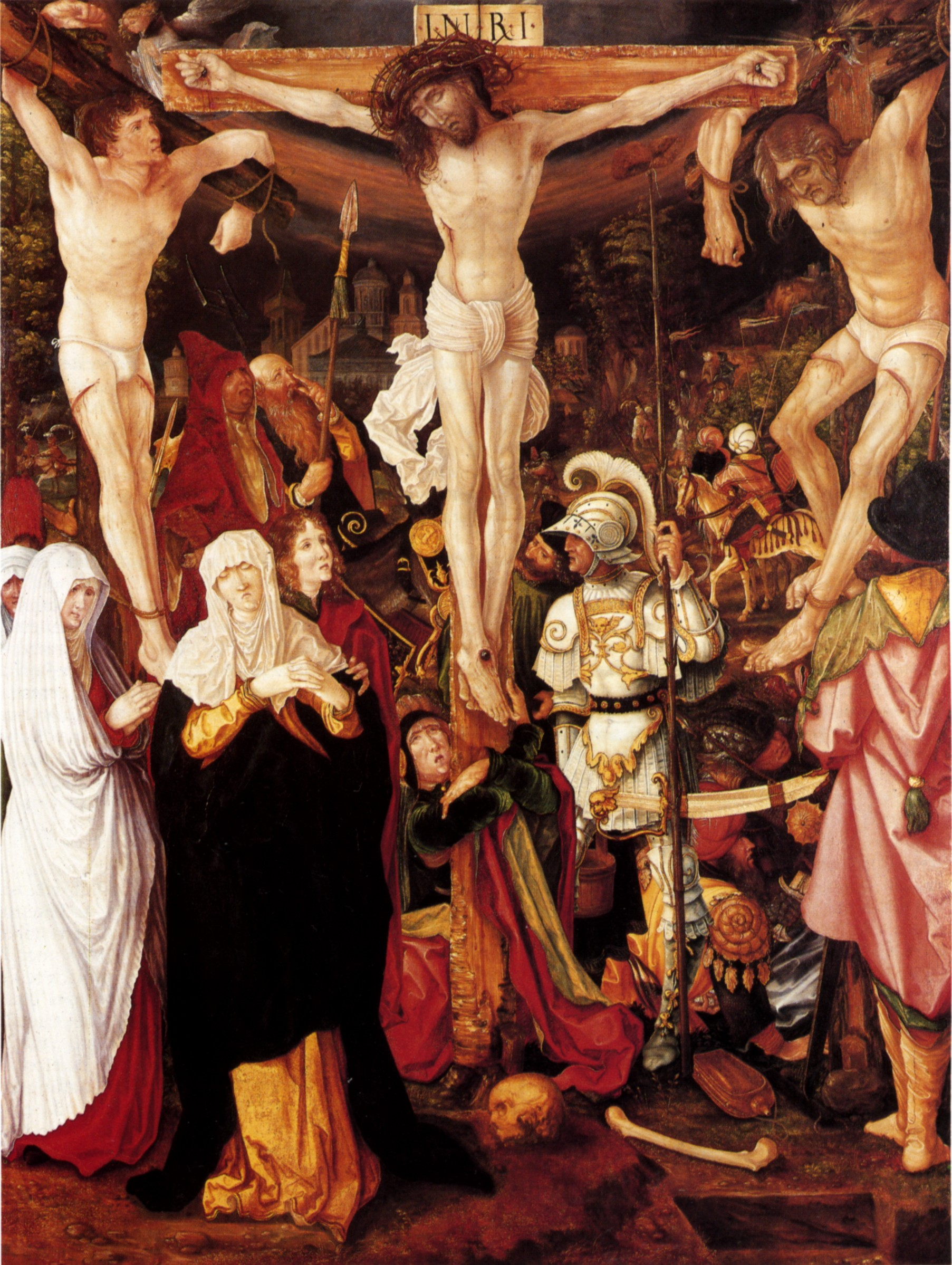
Crucifixion of Jesus with the Penitent Thief and the impenitent thief (central image of the Bockstorfer Altar in the Cathedral of Konstanz, painted in 1524)

Day of Prayers for Prisoners is a Polish Catholic holiday celebrated since 2009 every year on 26 March, established on the memorial day of Penitent Thief (known also as Good Thief, a patron of prisoners). The initiative came from the Association of Evangelical Help for Prisoners "Prison Brotherhood" in Warsaw. On this day for many years, the Prison Brotherhood organized a pilgrimage of prisoners' representatives to the Jasna Góra Monastery in Częstochowa, the major Polish Marian sanctuary. The idea behind establishing the Day of Prayers for Prisoners is a need to promote prayers especially among the prisoners who disassociate themselves entirely from God, who do not see any point in conversion or have lost their faith in Divine Mercy. Pope John Paul II during his fourth pastoral visit to Poland in 1991, visited the prison in Płock and said: "You are convicted, that's a truth, but you are not condemned. Each of you can, with a help of God's grace, become a saint."

== Day of Prayer for the Peace of Jerusalem ==
Day of Prayer for the Peace of Jerusalem is prayer meeting organized by Pentecostal evangelists Jack W. Hayford and Robert Stearns through their organization "Eagles Wings". They annually invite people around the world to pray for Jerusalem on the first Sunday of every October, close to the time of Yom Kippur. Their first prayer meeting occurred in 2004.

== Global Day of Prayer ==
The Global day of Prayer was founded by South African businessman Graham Power in 2000. Each year, the event spread to more African countries until it spread globally in 2005. It is an ecumenical Christian event and involves 10 days of prayer before the Western Christian observance of Pentecost (beginning with Ascension Day) and 90 days of prayer after Pentecost.

== Great Prayer Day ==
Great Prayer Day is a public holiday in Denmark introduced in 1686, in the wake of the Reformation of the national church, the Church of Denmark.

== Haystack Prayer Meeting ==
Held in August 1806, this is viewed by many scholars as the seminal event for the development of Protestant Missions in the subsequent decades and centuries. On a hot summer day, a few Williams College students gathered in a field to discuss the spiritual welfare of the people of Asia. When a thunderstorm developed over the field, the students took refuge in the lee of a large haystack and continued their prayer meeting, hence the title.

== International Day of Prayer for the Persecuted Church ==
Originating in the early 20th century, the International Day of Prayer for the Persecuted Church (often abbreviated as IDOP) is an observance within the Christian calendar in which congregations pray for Christians who are persecuted for their faith. It falls on the first Sunday of November, within the liturgical period of Allhallowtide, which is dedicated to remembering the martyrs and saints of Christianity. The International Day of Prayer for the Persecuted Church is observed by many Christian denominations, with over 100,000 congregations honoring the holiday worldwide. Congregations focus on "praying for individuals, families, churches, or countries where Christians are facing hard situations." Additionally, many congregations donate funds from their collection of tithes and offerings on the International Day of Prayer for the Persecuted Church to NGOs that support human rights of persecuted Christians.

== National Day of Prayer ==
This is a day designated by the United States Congress as a day when all Americans regardless of faith are asked to come together and pray in their own way. It is held on the first Thursday in May. A "National Day of Prayer Task Force" was created in order to coordinate the event.

== National Day of Prayer and Remembrance ==
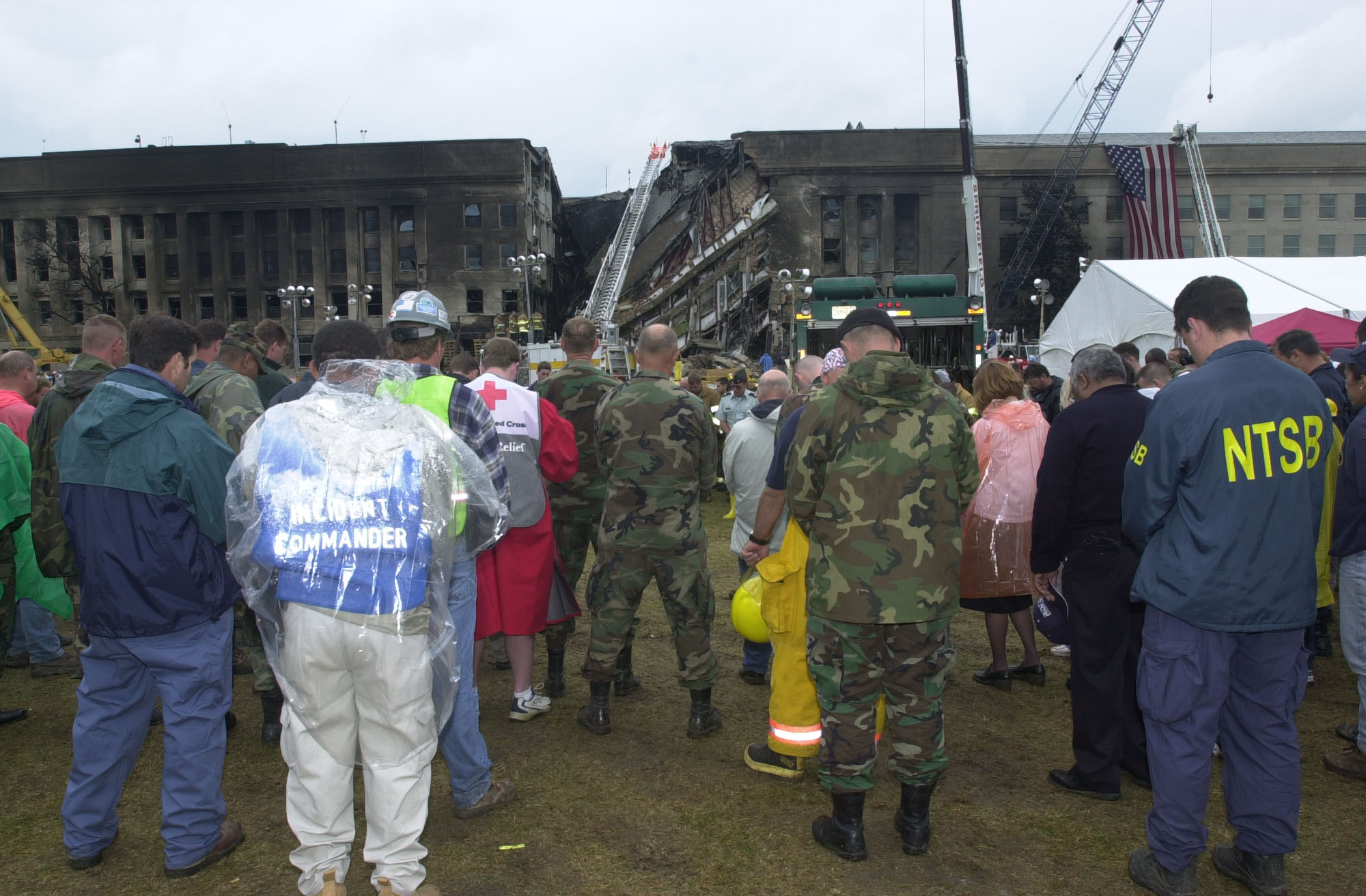
Rescue workers pause for moment of silence during National Day of Prayer and Remembrance outside the Pentagon crash site. September 14, 2001.

A day of prayer in the United States to commemorate the victims of the September 11 terrorist attacks.

== The First Link of Prayer from Jerusalem ==
The first globally publicized "link of prayer" for peace from Jerusalem was in June 1993 organized by Dan Mazar and the Jerusalem Christian Review, a Jerusalem-based archaeological journal. The event included more than 100 Christian and political leaders from around the world and was broadcast by satellite and radio live from Jerusalem.

Parts of the Global Prayer were also shown on the CNN, CBS, and ABC television networks and almost 120 other television stations worldwide. A short excerpt from the Associated Press of this event from June 1993 can still be found on youtube: https://www.youtube.com/watch?v=nGCNwyvnUds.

The Prayer Link began from Los Angeles, California with a prayer from the former U.S. President, Ronald Reagan: "I join my friends at the Jerusalem Christian Review... for this very special day. A day dedicated to prayer..." said the former US president and governor of the State of California. The "prayer link" also included prayers of political figures live by satellite from 5 continents. Leaders such as Jack Kemp, Jeane Kirkpatrick and numerous U.S. Senators, as well as former Australian Prime Minister Bob Hawke all prayed for the "Peace of Jerusalem". Also included were Christian evangelists Billy Graham, Pat Robertson, Jerry Falwell and James Dobson, along with denominational leaders from Europe, Africa, South America and Asia.

== World Day of Prayer ==
World Day of Prayer Logo since 1982

Held on the first Friday in March each year, the World Day of Prayer is the world's largest ecumenical laywomen's initiative. It is run under the motto Informed Prayer and Prayerful Action, and is celebrated annually by Christian women in over 170 countries. The movement aims to bring together women of various races, cultures and traditions in a yearly common day of prayer, as well as in closer fellowship, understanding and action throughout the year.

== World Day of Prayer for Peace ==
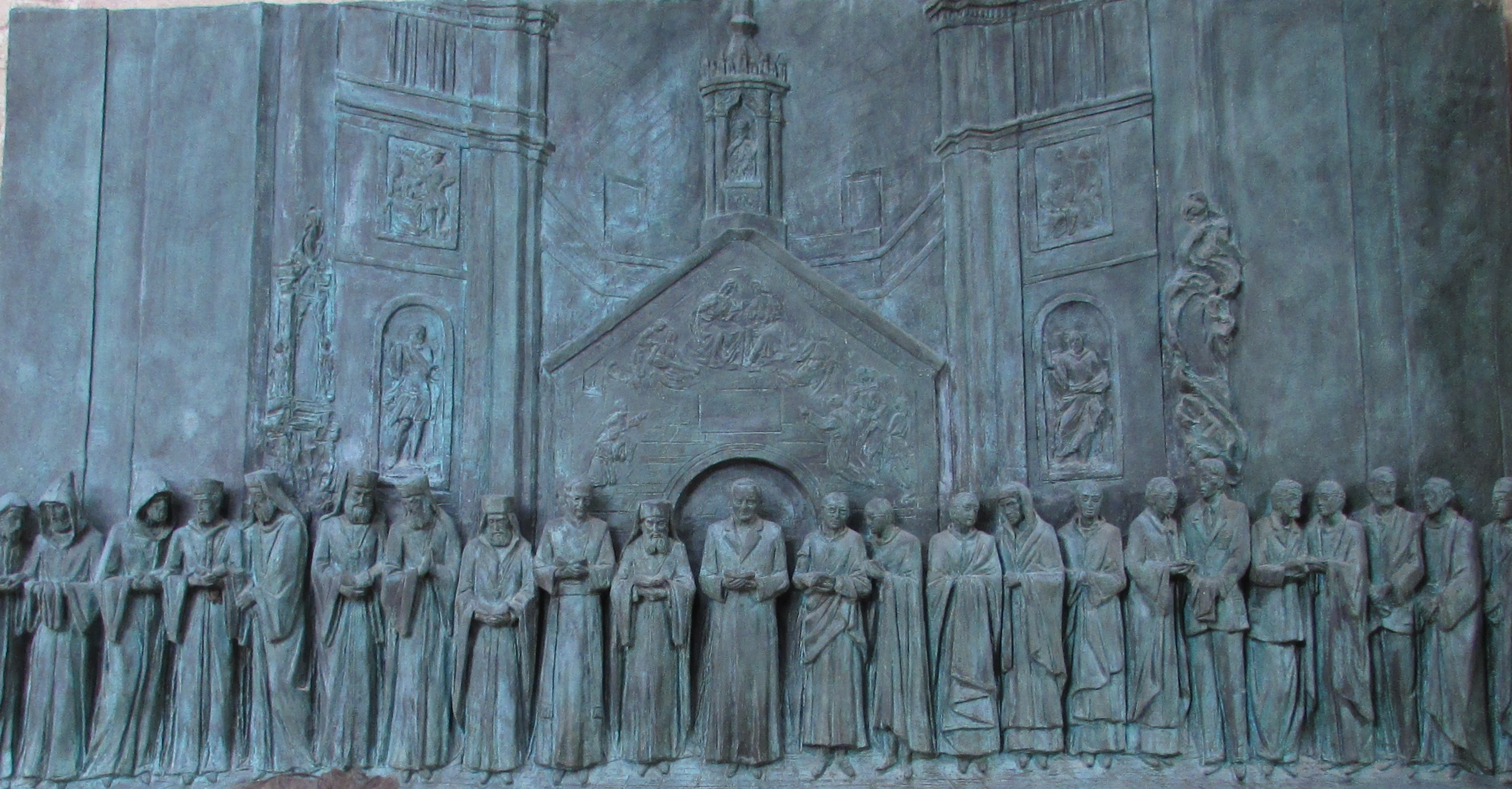
Memorial engraving of global religious leaders at the first "World Day of Prayer for Peace" in Assisi (1986)

Pope John Paul II organized the first World Day of Prayer for Peace in Assisi, Italy, on October 27, 1986. In all there were 160 religious leaders who spent the day together with fasting and praying to their God or Gods. They represented 32 Christian religious organizations and 11 other non-Christian world religions, including:

- Christian religions and organizations:
  - Catholic Church
  - Greek Orthodox Church
  - Russian Orthodox Church
  - World Council of Churches
  - World YWCA
  - World Alliance of YMCA's
  - Friends World Committee for Consultation (Quakers)
  - Mennonite World Conference
  - Reformed Ecumenical Synod
  - Baptist World Alliance
  - Christian Church (Disciples of Christ)
  - World Alliance of Reformed Churches
  - Lutheran World Federation
  - Anglican Communion
  - Old Catholic Church of Utrecht
  - Assyrian Church of the East
- non-Christian religions:
  - Hinduism
  - Sikhism
  - Buddhism
  - Jainism
  - Judaism
  - Islam
  - African and North American animism
  - Shintoism
  - Zoroastrianism
  - Baháʼí

In 1993, John Paul II repeated the Day of Prayer to pray for an end to the war in Bosnia, and invited leaders of the Christian, Muslim and Jewish religions. And on January 24, 2002, he organized another World Day of Prayer for Peace, again in Assisi. Some 200 other religious leaders were present, including Roman Catholic cardinals, Muslim clerics, Jewish rabbis, Buddhists, Sikhs, Baháʼís, Hindus, Jains, Zoroastrians and members of African traditional religions. Following the Terrorist attacks of September 11, 2001, the Assisi event intended to discourage making religion a motive for conflict in the 21st century. The Pope had explicitly condemned the attacks when they happened, saying there was no possible excuse or justification for such acts.

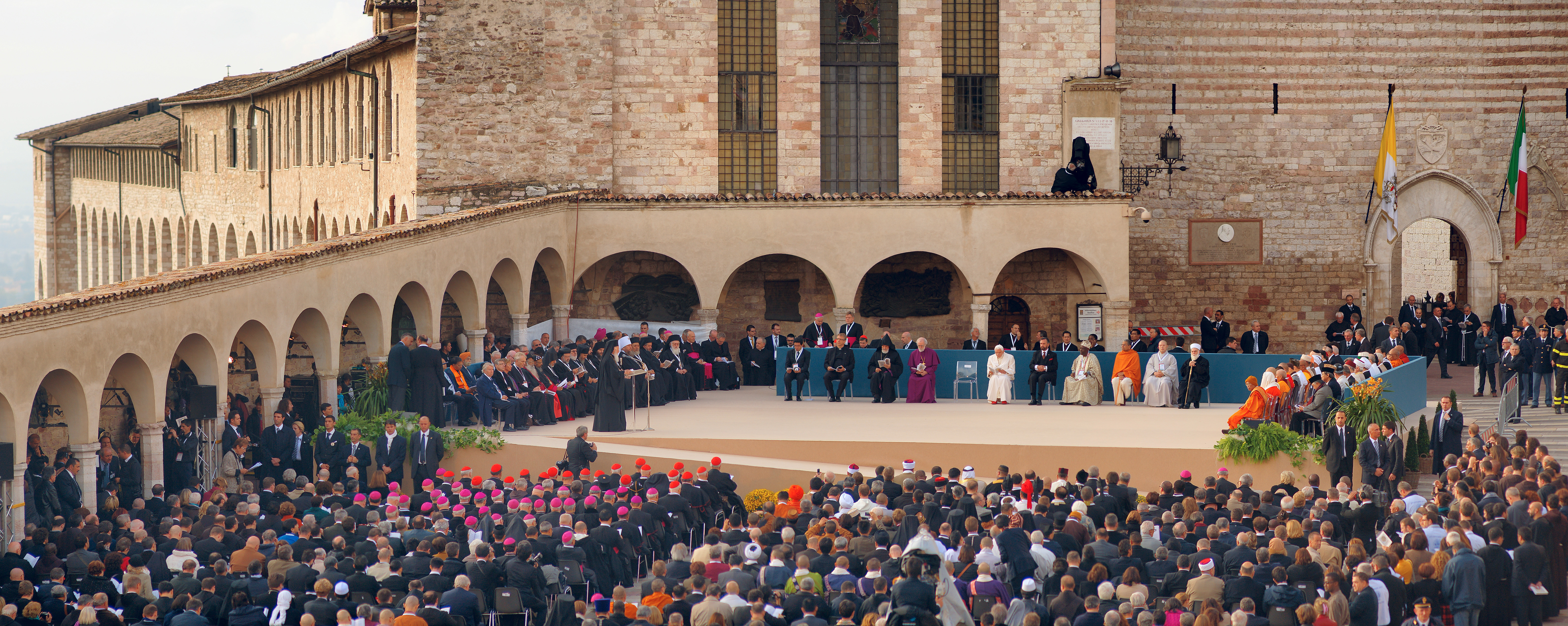
Meeting of the participants of the fourth "World Day of Prayer for Peace" in Assisi (2011)

Pope John Paul II's successor and former aide, Pope Benedict XVI, travelled to Assisi on October 27, 2011 for an ecumenical discussion to commemorate the 1986 meeting, but there was no single interdenominational prayer service. Benedict felt that, while such gatherings are good, one cannot give the impression – even externally, interpreted by others – that theological differences have been reduced or are not consequential.

== World Day of Prayer for Priests ==
On the feast day of the Sacred Heart (19 days after the Western Christian observance of Pentecost), the Roman Catholic Church holds a day of prayer for the sanctification of priests.

== World Day of Prayer for the Unborn ==
Some churches, especially the Catholic Church and similar churches, usually have a day of prayer for the unborn, which may also extend to prayers for the pregnant, and for an end to abortion, and even to other socially conservative concerns, such as the preservation of marriage, euthanasia, the elderly, and an end to embryonic stem cell research and genetic experimentation and eugenics, or even the death penalty. The Catholic Church has established January 22 as the Day of Prayer for the Legal Protection of Unborn Children.

== World Peace and Prayer Day ==
Chief Arvol Looking Horse, Spiritual Leader, Keeper of the White Buffalo Calf Pipe, was directed to begin a spiritual journey and he committed to organize World Peace and Prayer Day in the Four Directions that would be held annually on the summer solstice, June 21. As leader of the Lakota/Dakota/Nakota (Sioux) Nation, he has invited the people of the world to return to their sacred sites on June 21 to pray to the Creator to heal the Earth and to heal relationships between people. In 1996 Chief Looking Horse led a Unity Ride of Bigfoot Riders from the Wahpeton Dakota Reservation, Saskatchewan to Grey Horn Butte (He Hota Paha) Wyoming, called Devils Tower on current maps. Over the past sixteen years the event has been hosted in Ireland (2001), Durban, South Africa (2002), Australia (2003) and Japan (2004).

In 2005 the WPPD ceremony then returned to Paha Sapa, the Sacred Black Hills for another wopila (thank you). The Wolakota Youth Council embarked on a large-scale project called Prayer Run for World Peace 2005. This project included both First Nation tribes and many non-native youth from all cultures across the nation. Starting in May 2005 groups from the four directions started their run. Los Angeles, CA in the west, Manitoba, Canada in the north, Long Island, New York in the east and the southern group from Mexico and El Paso, TX. The youth concluded their run in the Black Hills to participate in the 10th annual World Peace and Prayer Day. There was also a Prayer Ride for World Peace that started from Cypress Hills Saskatchewan. A Horse Bundle was carried by the riders on a route that brought them across Montana and through many Tribal communities. As many as 15 youth stayed on their horses all the way to the event. It was a beautiful sight to see the horses and runners come in to the beginning of World Peace and Prayer Day. They brought all their prayers in one hoop of unity.

2006: A Prayer Run for World Peace started in Vancouver, British Columbia that spanned 2,262 miles to the site of World Peace and Prayer Day in Eklutna, Alaska, hosted by the Inuit.

2007: The Wolakota Youth Council also sponsored a Youth Prayer Run for World Peace that started in El Paso, TX and traveled over 1,600 miles to Mexico City, Mexico to the site of Teotihuacan for the ceremony that was hosted by the Mayan.

2008: The ceremony journeyed to New Zealand to Whangarei. The tribal communities of the Whangarei area mainly affiliate to the overarching tribe known as Ngati Wai who were the hosts.

2009: The Intertribal Friendship House in Oakland, CA hosted the WPPD ceremony.

2010: The fifteenth year of World Peace and Prayer Day was held at the Burgundy Brook Farm in Palmer, MA. It was hosted by Blue Star Equiculture and honored the Horse Nation.

2011 was held at Bdóte, the American Indian sacred site at the confluence of the Mississippi River and Minnesota River at the border of Minneapolis and Saint Paul Minnesota. The four-day event June 18–21 included speakers and spiritual leaders from previous WPPD events around the world and an attempt at the World's Largest Group Hug on June 19, 2011.
