= Bear Ye One Another's Burdens =

Bear Ye One Another's Burdens may refer to:

- the theme of a World prayer day 1935
- Bear Ye One Another's Burden, an East German drama film of 1988
