= Blue Christmas (holiday) =

Day in the Advent season marking the longest night of the year

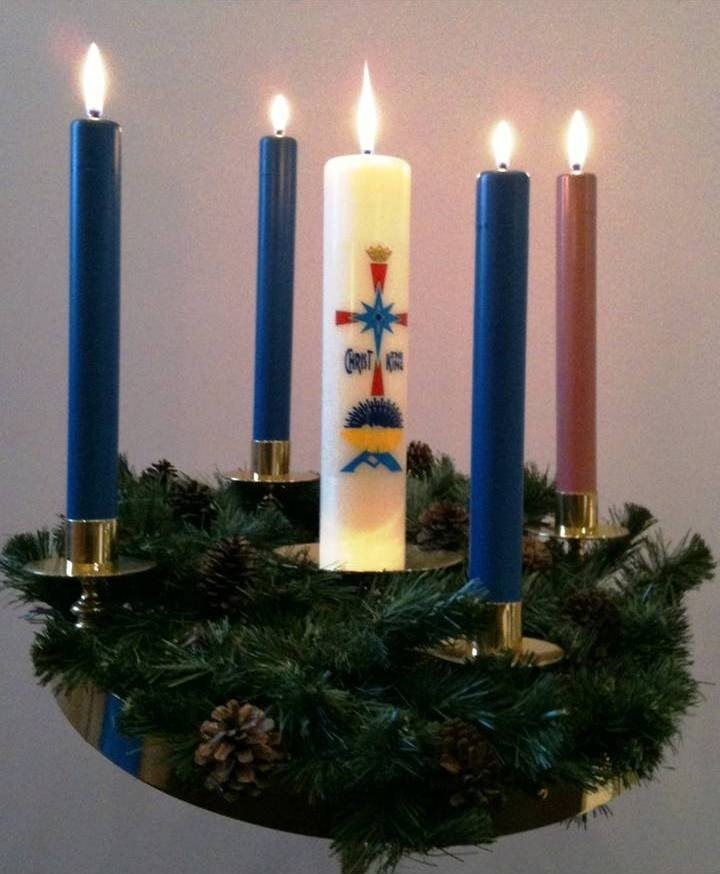
Blue Christmas is observed during the end of Advent, before Christmas Day

Blue Christmas (also called the Longest Night) in the Western Christian tradition is a day in the Advent season marking the longest night of the year. On this day, some churches in Western Christian denominations hold a church service that honours people that have lost loved ones and are experiencing grief. These include parishes of Catholicism, Anglicanism, Lutheranism, Methodism, Moravianism, and Reformed Christianity. The Holy Eucharist is traditionally a part of the service of worship on this day. This worship service is traditionally held on or around the longest night of the year, which falls on or about December 21, the Winter Solstice. There is an interesting convergence for this day as it is also the traditional feast day for Saint Thomas the Apostle. This linkage invites making some connections between Saint Thomas's struggle to believe in Jesus' resurrection, the long nights just before Christmas, and the struggle with darkness and grief faced by those living with loss.

The worship often includes opportunities for expression of grief, pain, and heartbreak as well as an opportunity to focus on the promise of hope found in Christ. Candles, arranged as an Advent wreath, may be lit during the service, and empty chairs may be reserved as a way of commemorating those lost during the previous year. The images of the winter solstice, including the beginning of increasingly longer days, are a significant part of the imagery used in this worship event.

Although the holiday originally emerged as a somber observance during the holiday season for those experiencing grief, depression, or loneliness, over time, the meaning of the holiday of Blue Christmas has evolved. The holiday is now also used as a day to celebrate and honor police officers. The color blue is closely associated with law enforcement, symbolizing trust, service, and loyalty. Many communities hold annual Blue Christmas events to recognize the dedication and sacrifices of police officers, especially during the holiday season when their work tends to intensify. These events may include ceremonies, memorials for fallen officers, and gatherings to show appreciation for their commitment to the community’s safety.

== See also ==
- Allhallowtide
- Saint Thomas Day
- Totensonntag
