= List of Christian human rights non-governmental organisations =

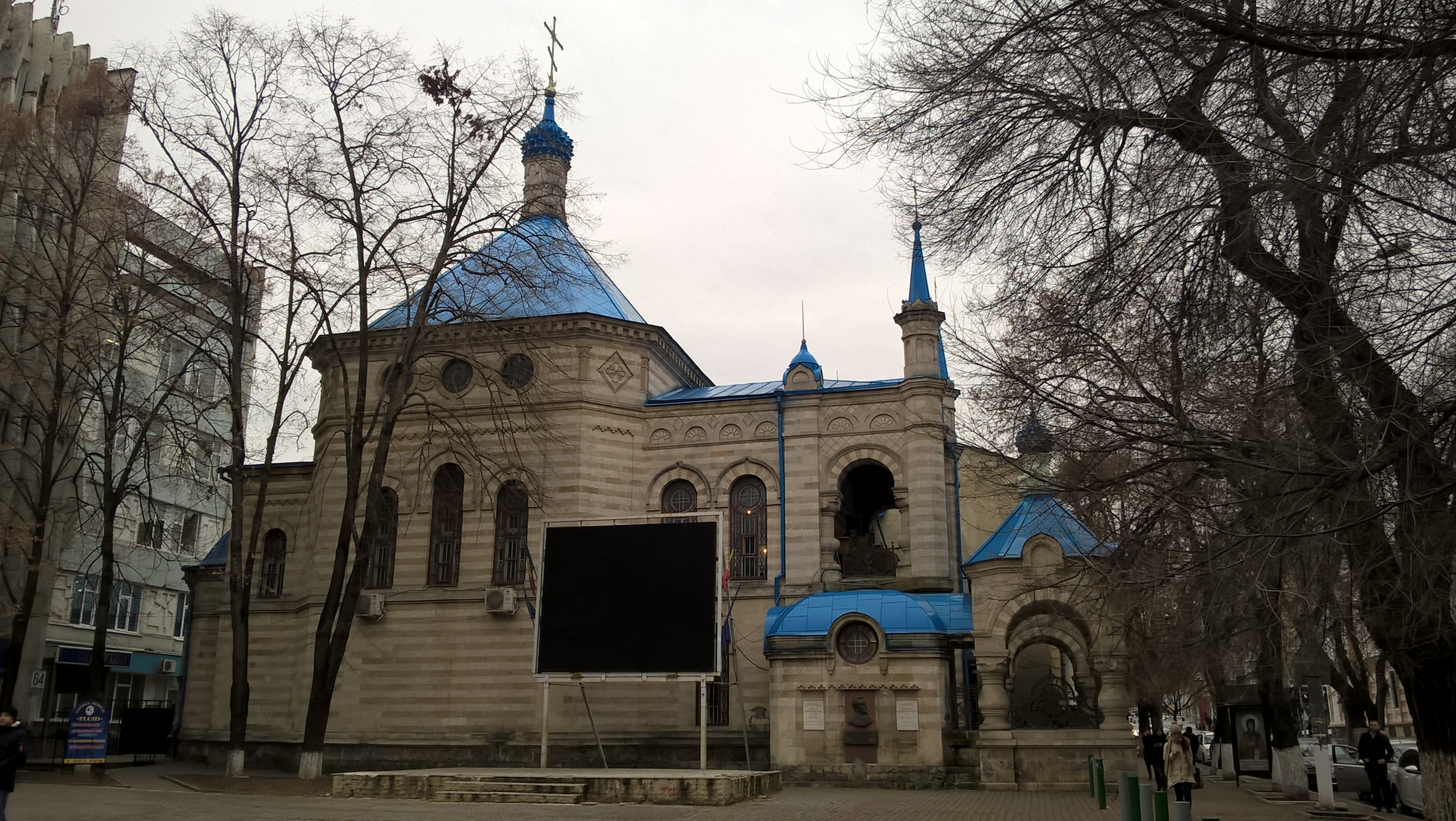
St. Teodora de la Sihla Church in Central Chișinău was one of the churches in the Moldavian Soviet Socialist Republic that was forcibly "converted into museums of atheism", under the doctrine of Marxist–Leninist atheism.

The following is a list of Christian human rights non-governmental organisations (or list of Christian human rights NGOs) that raise awareness about the persecution of Christians and advocates for them. It does not include political parties, or academic institutions.

== History ==
Christian human rights non-governmental organisations came into existence to address the plight of the persecution of Christians, though in historic times, various military orders such as the Knights Hospitaller and the Order of the Holy Sepulchre protected Christians from bandits and criminals in non-Christian states, giving them safe passage to the Holy Land. At present, there are a number of Christian human rights NGOs that are usually of an interdenominational nature that "campaign for the rights of Christians around the world."

In addition to advocating for the persecuted, Christian human rights non-governmental organisations provide information to various government agencies, such as the United States Commission on International Religious Freedom, which then makes policy recommendations on issues such as the persecution of Christians by Boko Haram in Nigeria. These Christian human rights NGOs document statistics about the persecution of Christians in various countries in order to help policy-makers set "informed decisions regarding trade, aid, visas, and related issues with a particular country." The human rights NGOs encourage "congressional delegations to [visit] areas of intense persecution" to mitigate the same.

== International non-governmental organizations ==
- Aid to the Church in Need
- Blessing Bethlehem
- ChinaAid
- Christian Freedom International
- Christian Solidarity Worldwide
- Christian Solidarity International
- Christian Concern
- International Christian Concern
- Observatory on Intolerance and Discrimination against Christians in Europe
- Open Doors
- Release International
- Samaritan's Purse
- Stefanus Alliance International
- Voice of the Martyrs
- World Relief

== See also ==
- Persecution of Christians in the modern era
- International Day of Prayer for the Persecuted Church
- Antireligious campaigns of the Chinese Communist Party
- Asia Bibi blasphemy case
- Persecution of Christians in the Eastern Bloc
- Persecution of Christians by ISIS
