= Christian Freedom International =

Religious human rights organization

Christian Freedom International (CFI) is a religious human rights NGO based in Front Royal, Virginia.

Christian Freedom International has been involved in efforts to address the issue of human slavery. It partners with churches and various denominations to address the persecution of Christians. Christian Freedom International calls on people to observe the International Day of Prayer for the Persecuted Church annually.

Christian Freedom International documents statistics about the persecution of Christians in various countries in order to help policy-makers set "informed decisions regarding trade, aid, visas, and related issues with a particular country." The human rights NGO encourages "congressional delegations to [visit] areas of intense persecution" to mitigate the same.

It is a member of the Evangelical Council for Financial Accountability (ECFA). According to ECFA's 2005 year-end data, 85.9% of CFI's revenues were used for program expenses, 9.9% for administrative expenses, and 4.2% for fund-raising expenses.
