= Allhallowtide =

Western Christian liturgical season

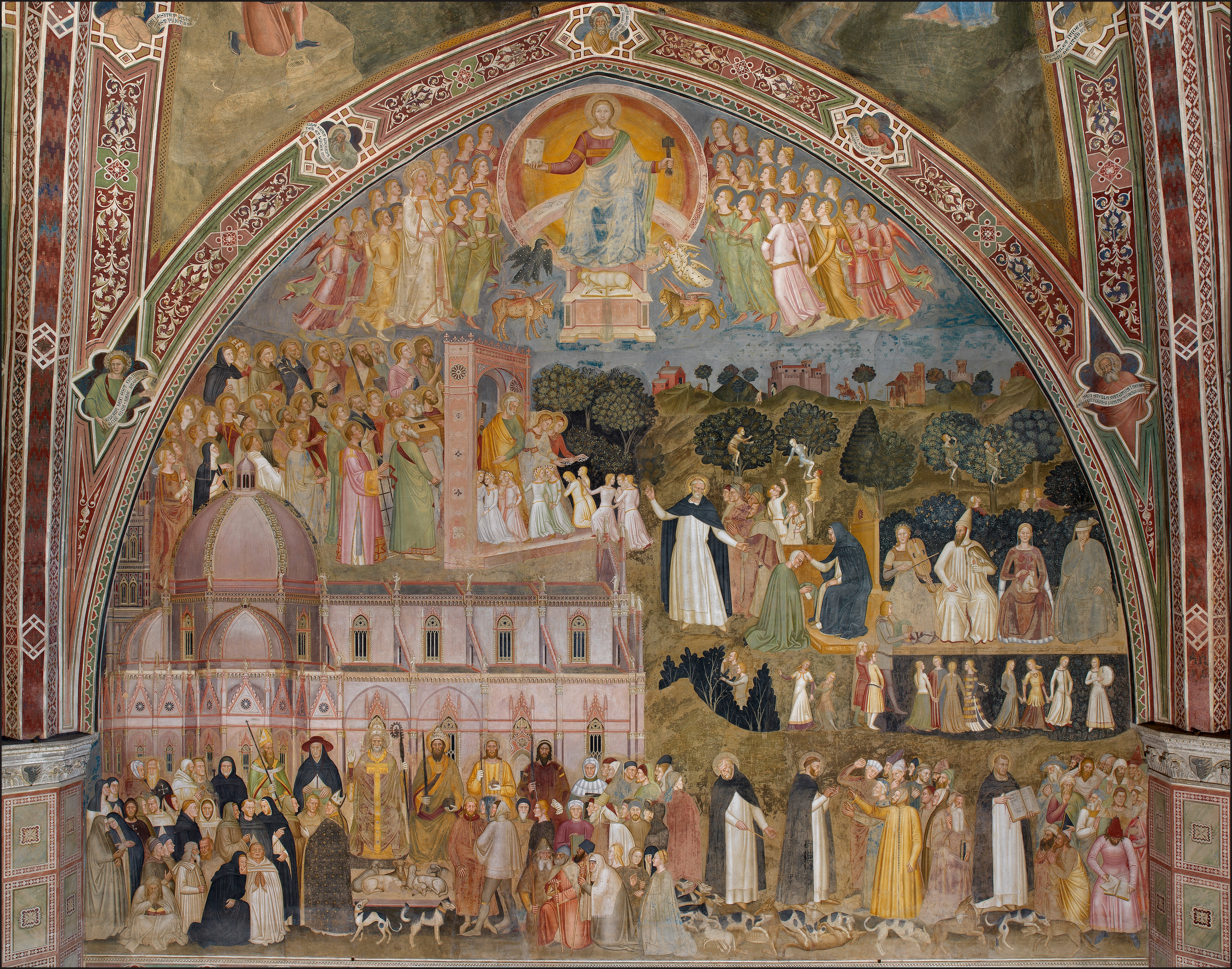
The Church Militant and the Church Triumphant, fresco by Andrea da Firenze in Santa Maria Novella, c. 1365

Allhallowtide (Note: also known as Hallowtide, Allsaintstide, or the Hallowmas season) is the Western Christian season encompassing the triduum of All Hallows' Eve (Halloween), All Hallows' Day (All Saints' Day) and All Souls' Day, as well as the International Day of Prayer for the Persecuted Church (observed on the first Sunday of November) and Remembrance Sunday (observed on the second Sunday in November) in some traditions. The period begins on 31 October annually. Allhallowtide is a "time to remember the dead, including martyrs, saints, and all faithful departed Christians." The present date of Hallowmas (All Saints' Day) and thus also of its vigil (Hallowe'en) was established for Rome perhaps by Pope Gregory III (731–741) and was made of obligation throughout the Frankish Empire by Louis the Pious in 835. Elsewhere, other dates were observed even later, with the date in Ireland being 20 April. In the early 11th century, the modern date of All Souls' Day was popularized, after Abbot Odilo established it as a day for the monks of Cluny and associated monasteries to pray for the dead.

== Etymology ==
The word Allhallowtide was first used in 1471, and is derived from three words: the Old English word hallow, meaning 'holy', the word tide, meaning 'time' or 'season' (cf. Christmastide, Eastertide), and all (from Old English eall) meaning "every". The latter part of the word Hallowmas is derived from the word Mass. The words hallow and saint are synonyms.

== History ==
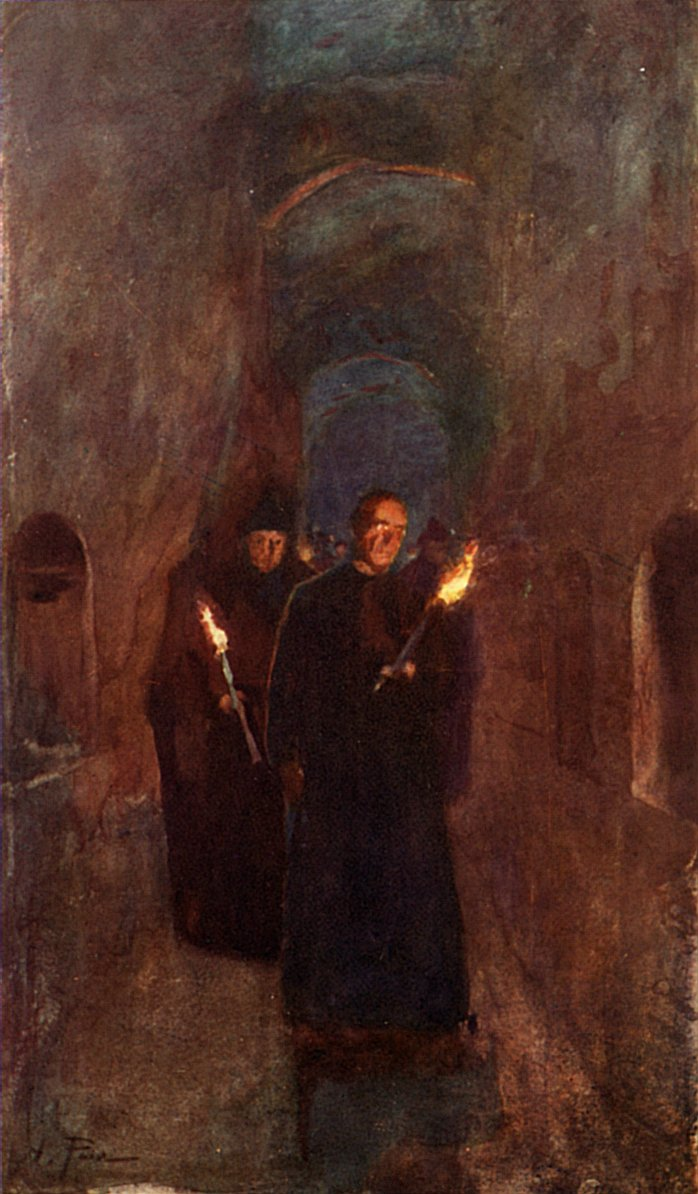
Many of the remains of the martyrs of the ancient Church lie in the catacombs

The Christian attitude toward the death of martyrs is first exemplified in the New Testament, which records that after the beheading of St. John the Baptist, his disciples respectfully buried him. Stephen was likewise "given a Christian burial by his fellow-Christians after he had been stoned to death by a mob." Two of the Post-Nicene Fathers, Ephrem the Syrian, as well as John Chrysostom, both wrote about the importance of honoring the dead; the theologian Herman Heuser writes that in the early Church, the feast days of the martyrs were local observances, with churches being built on those sites where their blood was shed. Frances Stewart Mossier explains that this changed during the persecution of Christians in the Roman Empire, saying that:

This arrangement worked very well at first, but soon there were more martyrs than there were days in the year, and so one day was set apart in honor of them all, and called All Saints' Day. This took place about the year A.D. 610. The day of the year on which the festival first occurred was the first of May, and it was not till two hundred years after that it was changed to Nov. 1, the day we now observe. The Christians of those times were in the habit of spending the night before All Saints' Day in thinking over the good and helpful lives of those in whose honor the day was kept and in praying that they might be like them. Services were held in the churches, and candles and incense burned before the pictures and statues of the saints. It was to them one of the holiest, most significant days of all the year.

Following the establishment of All Hallows' Day and its vigil, All Hallows' Eve in the 8th century, Odilo of Cluny popularized the day to pray for All Souls, forming the third day of the triduum of Allhallowtide.

The octave of Allhallowtide, lasting "eight days was established by Pope Sixtus IV in 1430 for the whole Western Church." The octave, however, was eliminated in the 1955 reforms of the Catholic Church, although it continues to be observed by many Lutherans and Anglicans. The faithful may still obtain a Plenary Indulgence by visiting a cemetery and praying for the dead during the octave of All Hallows. Within Allhallowtide, which has a theme revolving around martyrs and saints, many Christian denominations also observe the International Day of Prayer for the Persecuted Church on the first Sunday of November, to remember those who continue to be persecuted for their Christian faith. In the United Kingdom, the Church of England, mother church of the Anglican Communion, extended All Saints-tide to include Remembrance Sunday in the 20th century.

== Triduum ==
=== All Hallows' Eve ===
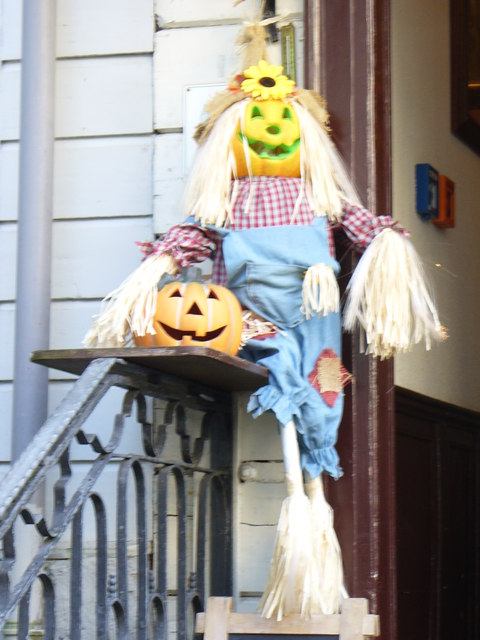
Hallowe'en decorations in Eifeler Hof, North Rhine-Westphalia, Germany.

All Hallows' Eve, often contracted as Halloween, is the eve of All Hallows' Day (All Saints' Day), and the first day of the Allhallowtide. According to some scholars, the Christian Church absorbed some Celtic practices associated with Samhain and Christianised the celebration in order to ease the Celts' conversion to Christianity; other scholars maintain that the Christian observance of All Hallows' Eve arose completely independent of Samhain. On All Hallows' Eve, some believed that the veil between the material world and the afterlife thinned. In order to prevent recognition by a soul, "people would don masks or costumes to disguise their identities"; in North America, this tradition is perpetuated through the practice of trick or treating. In medieval Poland, believers were taught to pray out loud as they walk through the forests in order that the souls of the dead might find comfort; in Spain, Christian priests tolled their church bells in order to allow their congregants to remember the dead on All Hallows' Eve.

The Christian Church traditionally observed Hallowe'en through a vigil "when worshippers would prepare themselves with prayers and fasting prior to the feast day itself." This church service is known as the Vigil of All Hallows or the Vigil of All Saints; an initiative known as Night of Light seeks to further spread the observance of Vigil of All Hallows throughout Christendom. After the service, "suitable festivities and entertainments" often follow, as well as a visit to the graveyard or cemetery, where flowers and candles are often placed in preparation for All Saints' Day (All Hallows' Day).

=== All Hallows' Day ===
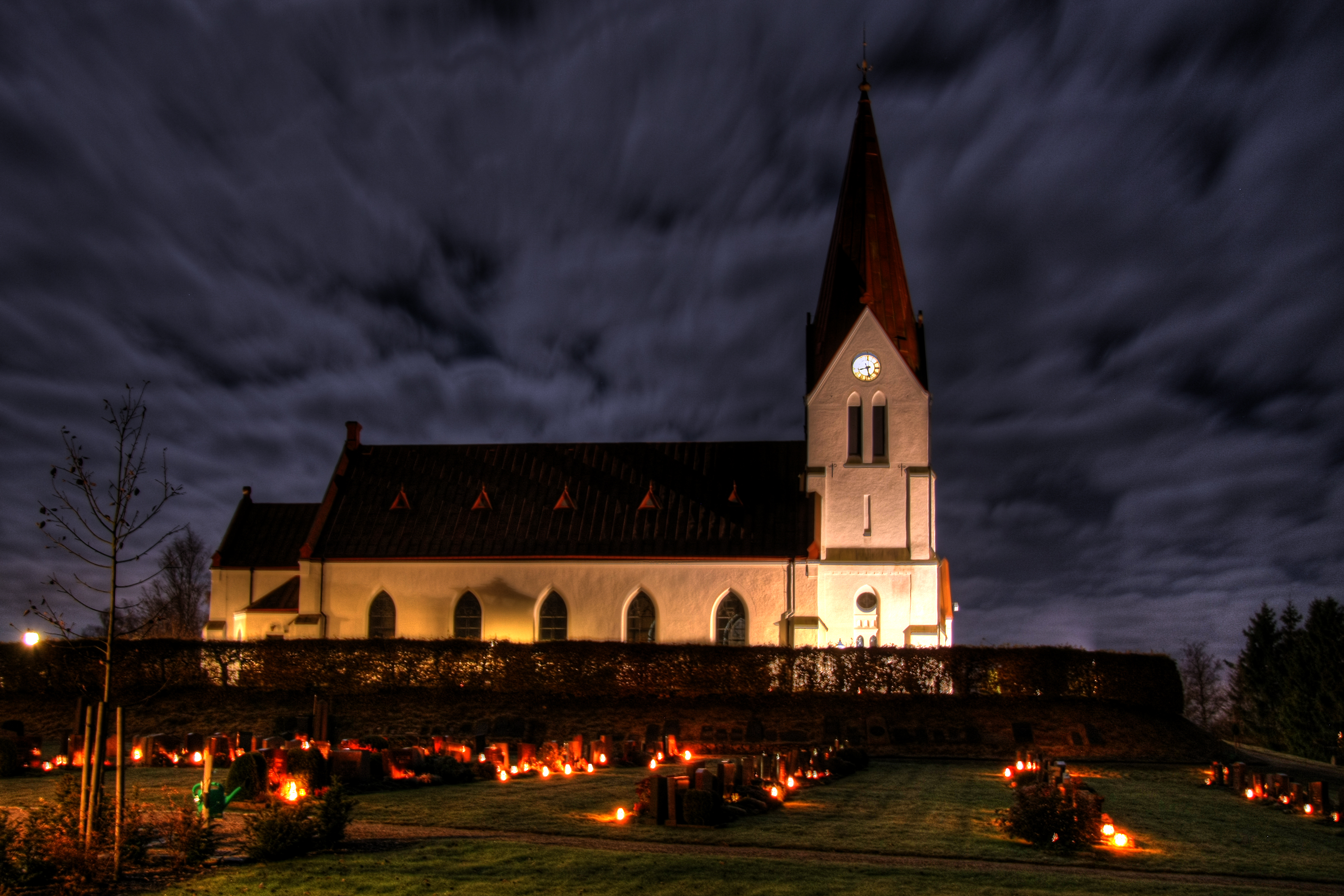
A cemetery outside an Evangelical Lutheran church (Church of Sweden) in Röke, Sweden on the feast of All Hallows. Flowers and lighted candles are placed by relatives on the graves of their deceased loved ones.

The second day of Allhallowtide is known as All Saints' Day, All Hallows' Day, or Hallowmas. Occurring on 1 November, it is a "principal feast of the church year, and one of the four days recommended for the administration of baptism" in Anglicanism. In some Christian denominations, All Saints' Day may be "celebrated on the Sunday following November 1." All Saints' Day is a holy day to honour all the saints and martyrs, both known and unknown. All Hallows' Day is "a universal Christian holy day," but it has a special importance in the Roman Catholic Church, Evangelical Lutheran churches, Anglican Church, and some other Protestant churches. The liturgical colour of All Saints' Day is white, which is "symbolic of victory and life." While honouring the Church Triumphant, All Hallows' Day seeks to especially "honour the blessed who have not been canonized and who have no special feast day." On All Saints' Day, many Christians visit graveyards and cemeteries in order to place flowers and candles on the graves of their loved ones. This is a common practice in countries such as Italy, Spain, Poland, the Philippines, as well as certain parts of the United States heavily influenced by Roman Catholicism such as Louisiana and Maryland. For Roman Catholic Christians, attending Mass (Eucharist, Holy Communion, "Lord's Supper") is compulsory, as All Saints' Day (All Hallows' Day) is a holy day of obligation; for members of other Christian denominations, such as the Evangelical Lutheran Church, Anglican Church / Episcopal Church, Methodist Church and some other Protestant Christians, though not mandatory, attendance at worship services is encouraged.

=== All Souls' Day ===
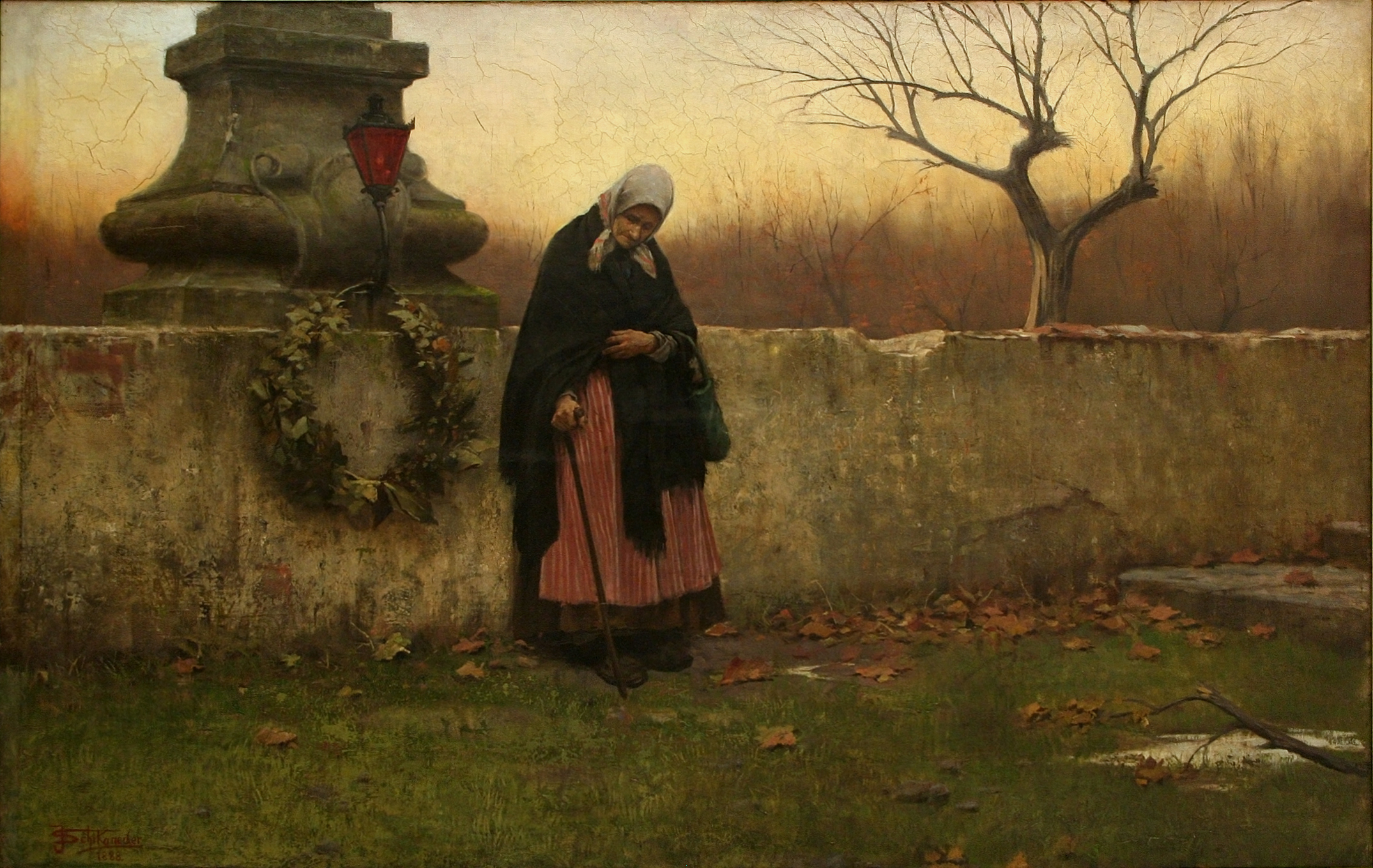
All Souls' Day, J Schikaneder 1888. This oil painting shows an elderly woman praying after placing a wreath upon the tombstone of her loved one.

The final day of Allhallowtide is known as All Souls' Day, and is also called the Commemoration of All Faithful Departed. All Souls' Day focuses on honouring all faithful Christians "who are unknown in the wider fellowship of the church, especially family members and friends." However, today, All Saints' Day and All Souls' Day have become conflated, and many Christians remember all the dead souls or "saints" on All Saints' Day.' The observance of All Souls' Day "was spread throughout Europe" by Saint Odilo of Cluny in the early 11th century. Like All Hallows' Eve and All Saints' Day (All Hallows' Day), family members often attend mass and visit the graves of their deceased loved ones, placing flowers and lighted candles there. In many Anglican / Episcopal, Evangelical Lutheran and Roman Catholic Christian services, an A.D. 7th-century prayer The Office of the Dead is read out in churches on All Souls' Day." In England, a popular tradition associated with All Souls' Day is souling, in which "bands of children, or of poor men, went round to the houses of the well-to-do on Souling Day, as they called it, begging money, apples, ale, or doles of cake. In some parts specially baked cakes were prepared in readiness to give away; they were called soul-cakes." The individuals who go souling often chant rhymes as they go door to door; for example, an old saying goes: "A Soule-cake, a soule-cake, have mercy on all Christian souls for a soule-cake." Historically, in France, on All Souls' Day, "the burial fraternities were especially active in decorating the churchyard, and everywhere priests led a procession around the graveyard and blessed the graves."

== See also ==
- Blue Christmas
- Calendar of Saints (Lutheran)
- Day of the Dead
- Festival of the Dead
- General Roman Calendar
- Paschal Triduum
- Saints in Anglicanism
- Thursday of the Dead
- Totensonntag
