= Jerusalem Christian Review =

Jerusalem Christian Review is a newspaper for Christians published in Jerusalem.

Jerusalem Christian Review is the highest distributed newspaper for Christians in Israel.

== Publishers ==
It was founded in April 1993 and reports on archaeological discoveries which shed light on the biblical narrative. It is published by the non-profit Jerusalem Bible Holy-Land Center, an educational foundation formed in 1968 by a group of Christian and Jewish scholars.

Jerusalem Christian Review's Managing Editor is biblical historian Dan Mazar, the author of numerous works on Christian-Israel relations and Second Temple archaeology. Mazar is also a former chairman of the politically powerful advocacy group, the Christian Mid-East Conference.

The newspaper includes contributions and endorsements by well known Christian and political figures, including Christian psychologist James Dobson, Christian Broadcasting Network president Pat Robertson, Evangelist Franklin Graham, former Southern Baptist president Charles Stanley and Seventh-day Adventist leader George Vandeman. In Volume 12, Issue 2, Israeli Prime Minister Benjamin Netanyahu writes to the readers of the Jerusalem Christian Review, explaining that, "The... Review connects the history of Israel to today's realities of the Middle East."

== Articles ==
Published on each issue's front page is the Jerusalem Christian Review's slogan: New discoveries of the Bible, Jesus, and the First Church.

In Volume 12, Issue 1, of the newspaper, former Israeli premier Yitzhak Shamir writes that,"the Jerusalem Christian Review, Jerusalem's leading Christian newspaper... reports on archaeological and historical discoveries [in Israel]: its insightful commentary on the past in its relevance to the present."

Among the articles of note published in recent editions are:

- Jerusalem Burial Cave Reveals: Names, Testimonies of First Christians
- Unearthing the Temple Mount
- First Century Papyrus Reveals the Gospel of Matthew
- The Dead Sea: Reviving Ancient Secrets at the Lowest Place of Earth
- Is this the Palace of King David?

== First World Prayer for Peace from Jerusalem ==
The Jerusalem Christian Review was responsible for organizing the first globally publicized "link of prayer" for peace from Jerusalem (See World Day of Prayer). This was in June 1993 and the event included more than one hundred Christian and political leaders from around the world broadcast live by satellite and radio from Jerusalem.

Hosted by Jerusalem Christian Review Managing Editor Dan Mazar, parts of the Global Prayer were also shown on the CNN, CBS, and ABC television networks and almost 120 other television stations worldwide. The Prayer Link began from Los Angeles, California with a prayer from the former U.S. president, Ronald Reagan: "I join my friends at the Jerusalem Christian Review... for this very special day. A day dedicated to prayer..." said the former US president and governor of the State of California. The "prayer link" also included prayers of political figures live by satellite from 5 continents. Leaders such as Jack Kemp, Jeane Kirkpatrick and numerous U.S. Senators, as well as former Australian Prime Minister Bob Hawke all prayed for the "Peace of Jerusalem". Also included were Christian evangelists Billy Graham, Pat Robertson, Jerry Falwell and James Dobson, along with denominational leaders from Europe, Africa, South America and Asia.
