= International Day of Prayer for the Persecuted Church =

Observance in the Christian calendar

- Also called: IDOP
- Liturgical color: Red
- Type: Christian
- Observances: Church services, prayer, fundraising for persecuted Christians
- Date: First Sunday of November
- 2025 date: November 2
- 2026 date: November 1
- 2027 date: November 7
- 2028 date: November 5
- Frequency: annual
- Related to: Allhallowtide; Day of the Christian Martyr

The International Day of Prayer for the Persecuted Church (often abbreviated as IDOP) is an observance within the Christian calendar in which congregations pray for Christians who are persecuted for their faith. It falls on the first Sunday of November, within the liturgical period of Allhallowtide, which is dedicated to remembering the martyrs and saints of Christianity. The International Day of Prayer for the Persecuted Church is observed by many Christian denominations, with over 100,000 congregations honoring the holiday worldwide. Congregations focus on "praying for individuals, families, churches, or countries where Christians are facing hard situations." Additionally, many congregations donate funds from their collection of tithes and offerings on the International Day of Prayer for the Persecuted Church to NGOs that support human rights of persecuted Christians, such as Voice of the Martyrs, International Christian Concern, and Open Doors.

== History ==
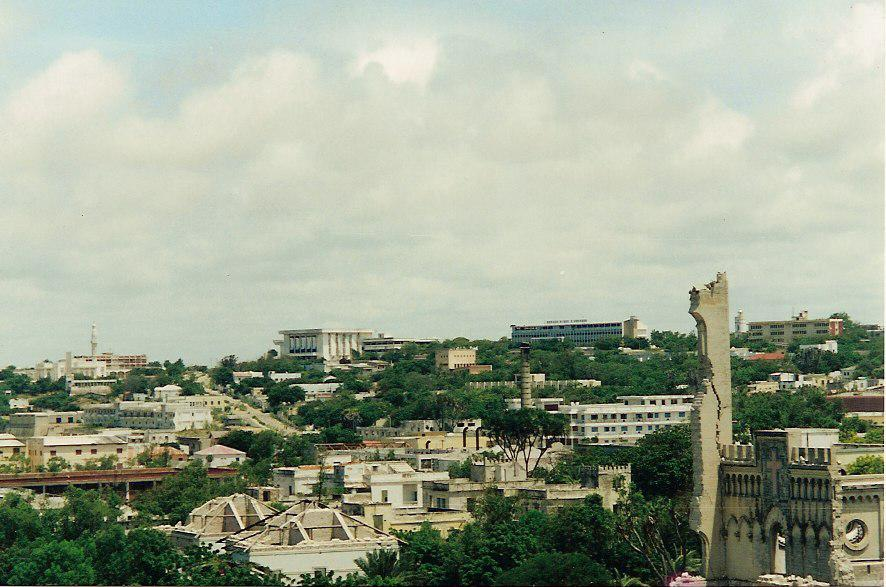
The remains of the Mogadishu Cathedral, which belonged to the Catholic christians of Somalia, after being destroyed by the Islamist terrorist group Al-Shabaab

The persecution of Christians has increased in the modern era. According to a 2019 review chaired by the Church of England's Bishop of Truro, Christians are the most persecuted religious group in the world.

The International Day of Prayer for the Persecuted Church originated in the 20th century to raise awareness of the increasing violence, torture, death, "worship restrictions, public humiliation, and social isolation" that some Christians face in atheist states, such as in North Korea, as well as in South Asia and the Middle East; the observance was spearheaded by the United States Conference of Catholic Bishops, the World Evangelical Alliance, and the Southern Baptist Convention. It has since been observed in many Christian denominations, such as the United Methodist Church and certain Catholic parishes. The International Day of Prayer for the Persecuted Church falls on the first Sunday of November, within the liturgical period of Allhallowtide, which is dedicated to remembering the martyrs and saints of Christianity.

The November observance has been promulgated by many NGOs that champion human rights for Christians, including Voice of the Martyrs, Open Doors, and International Christian Concern. Victims of persecution, including believers and missionaries, have also advocated to spread the International Day of Prayer for the Persecuted Church.

== See also ==
- List of Christian human rights non-governmental organisations
- Priest Barracks of Dachau Concentration Camp
- Martyrs of the Spanish Civil War, 1931–1939
- Day of the Christian Martyr
- Antireligious campaigns of the Chinese Communist Party
- Asia Bibi blasphemy case
- Persecution of Christians in the Eastern Bloc
- World Day of Prayer
