= Totensonntag =

Protestant religious holiday in Germany and Switzerland

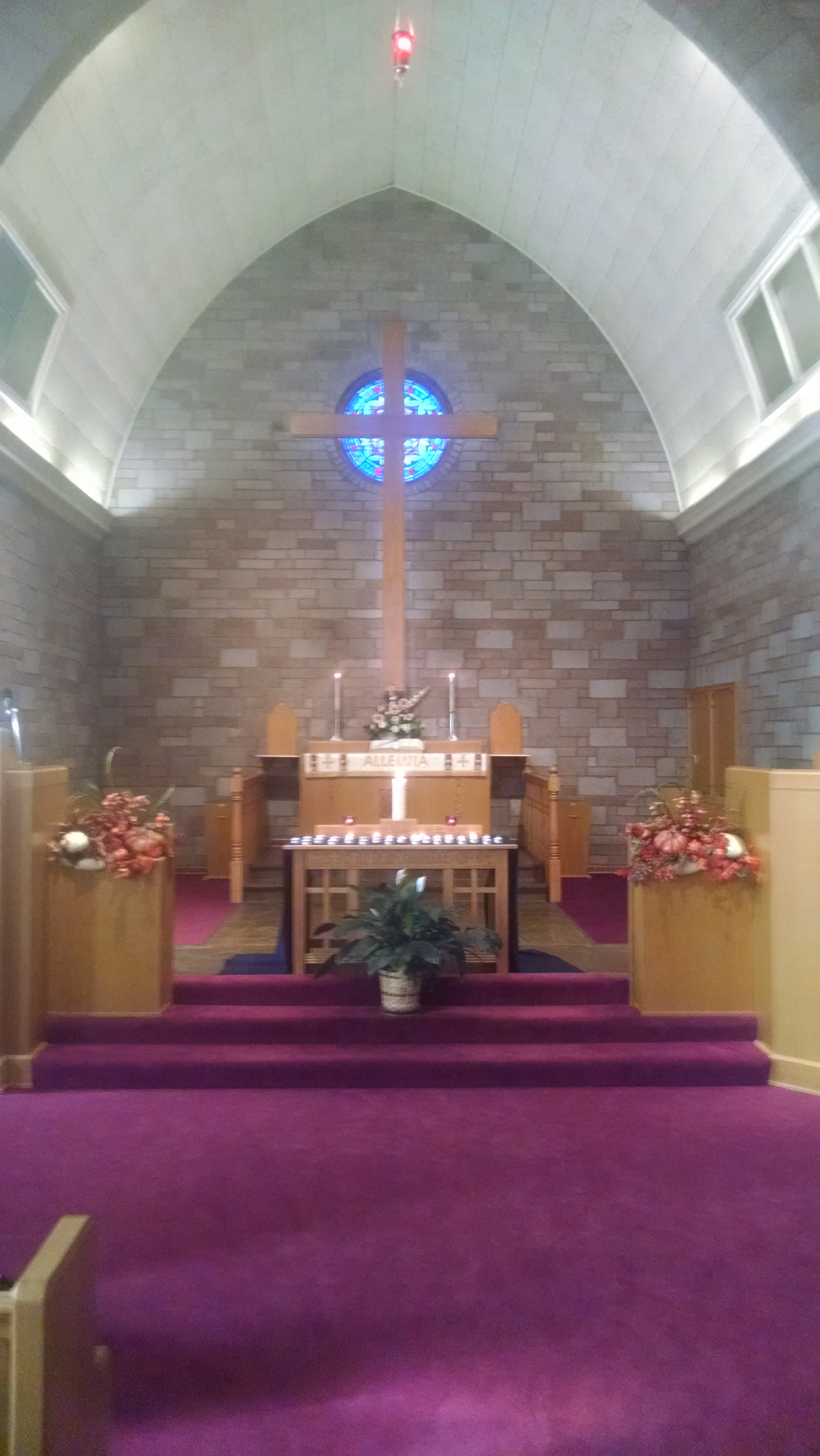
- A congregation of the United States–based denomination Evangelical and Reformed Church observing Totensonntag by lighting votive candles in memory of the faithful departed
- Also called: Ewigkeitssonntag; Totenfest
- Observed by: Lutherans and Reformed in Germany
- Significance: Remembrance of the Faithful Departed
- Observances: church services, praying for the dead, lighting votive candles, visiting cemeteries and graveyards
- Date: First Advent Sunday – 7 days
- Related to: Allhallowtide, Advent

Totensonntag (German: [ˈtoːtn̩zɔntaːk] , Sunday of the Dead), also called Ewigkeitssonntag (Eternity Sunday) or Totenfest, is a Protestant religious holiday in Germany and Switzerland, commemorating the faithful departed. It falls on the last Sunday of the liturgical year in the Protestant Church in Germany and the Protestant Church in the Netherlands.

== History ==
With development of the liturgical year in the Middle Ages, readings on the last things were connected with the last Sundays of the liturgal year. While on the antepenultimate Sunday the focus is on death, the penultimate Sunday has the topic Last Judgment and the last Eternal Life. Traditionally, the last Sunday of the liturgical year deals in a special way with the expectation of Judgment Day. The Gospel is that of Parable of the Ten Virgins.

In 1816, King Frederick William III of Prussia issued a decree that required all Lutheran churches in the areas under Prussian rule to observe the last Sunday before Advent as a "general celebration in memorial of the deceased". Other Lutheran churches in the remainder of Germany followed, eventually, as well.

In the United States, some Protestant churches celebrate this service of remembrance as Totenfest.

== Special protection ==
Totensonntag is particularly protected in all German federal states. The public holiday laws of all federal states determine Totensonntag as a day of mourning and remembrance and a so-called quiet day, for which special restrictions apply.

== Sunday in ecumenism ==
In the Roman Catholic Church, the last sunday of the liturgical year is celebrated as Solemnity of Christ the King. The feast emphasizes the rule of Christ in eternity and shows parallels to Eternity Sunday. English Lutheran churches that follow the Revised Common Lectionary also celebrate Christ the King Sunday. In the Catholic tradition, the faithful departed are remembered on All Souls' Day, which is liturgical counterpart to Totensonntag.

== See also ==
- Thursday of the Dead
