= World Day of Prayer =

International Christian lay initiative

World Day of Prayer Logo since 1982

The Women's World Day of Prayer is an international ecumenical Christian laywomen's initiative. It is run under the motto "Informed Prayer and Prayerful Action" and is celebrated annually in over 170 countries on the first Friday in March. The movement aims to bring together women of various races, cultures and traditions in a yearly common Day of Prayer, as well as in closer fellowship, understanding and action throughout the year.

== History ==
The Women's World Day of Prayer started in the US in 1887 when Mary Ellen Fairchild James, wife of Darwin Rush James from Brooklyn, New York, called for a day of prayer for home missions, and Methodist women called for a week of prayer and self-denial for foreign missions. Two years later, two Baptists called together a Day of Prayer for the World Mission. The Day of Prayer initiated by these two women expanded to Canada in 1922, then to the British Isles in the 1930s. The movement's focus on ecumenism and reconciliation led to growth after World War II. Since 1927, the day of prayer in the month of March has been known as the Women's World Day of Prayer. Catholic women joined the movement after the Second Vatican Council, beginning in 1967, and united what had been their May day of prayer with the March Women's World Day of Prayer in 1969. As such, Catholic women honor the World Day of Prayer.

== Aims ==
Through the World Day of Prayer, women are encouraged to become aware of the other countries and cultures and no longer live in isolation. They are also encouraged take up the burdens of other people, to sympathize with the problems of other countries and cultures and pray with and for them. They are further encouraged to become aware of their talents and use them in the service of society. The World Day of Prayer aims to demonstrate that prayer and action are inseparable and that both have immeasurable influence in the world.

== Programme ==
Every year, worship service focuses on a different country and a specific theme. World Day of Prayer National/Regional Committees of that country prepare the order of worship on these themes to be used on the next World Day of Prayer.

On the first Friday of March, that country then becomes the focus of prayer and understanding. The worship service is meant to teach women how other countries, languages and cultures understand biblical passages in their context. They learn of the concerns and needs of those women and to empathize and feel solidarity with them.

== World Day of Prayer themes and writer countries ==
see

Year	Theme	Writer Country
1927	Pray Ye Therefore	USA
1928	Breaking Down Barriers	USA
1929	That They May All Be One	USA
1930	That Jesus May Be Lifted Up	Korea
1931	Ye Shall Be My Witnesses	Canada
1932	Hold Fast in Prayer	India
1933	Follow Thou Me	Republic of China
1934	Pray for the Peace of Jerusalem	South Africa
1935	Bear Ye One Another's Burdens	Holland
1936	On Earth, Peace, Goodwill Toward Men	Chile
1937	Thou art The Christ, The Son of the Living God	Africa
1938	The Church – A World Fellowship	New Zealand
1939	Let Us Put Our Love Into Deeds – and Make it Real	United States of America
1940	In Quietness and in Confidence shall be Your Strength	England
1941	Thy Kingdom Come	Shanghai
1942	I Am The Way	French Refugees German Refugees
1943	That They all May Be One	United States of America
1944	God wondered that there was no Intercessor	From statements of 150 nationals and repatriated missionaries from over 100 countries
1945	That Ye Should Show Forth the Praises of Him Who Hath Called You Out of Darkness into His Marvelous Light	England Wales; Northern Ireland
1946	The Things That Make for our Peace	Central Africa
1947	Make Level in the Desert a Highway for our God	India
1948	The World at Prayer	United States of America
1949	The Lord is Thy Keeper	China
1950	Faith for our Time	Japan
1951	Perfect Love Casteth out Fear	Germany
1952	Christ, our Hope	United States of America: Migrants, Sharecroppers, and Native Americans
1953	Walk as Children of the Light	Africa
1954	That They May Have Life	India
1955	Abide in Me	Buenos Aires (Argentina)
1956	One Flock, One Shepherd	Cook Christian Training School for Native American Christian Leaders in Arizona, USA
1957	Who shall separate us ...?	Hungary
1958	The Bread of Life	Australia
1959	Lord, I believe	Egypt
1960	Labourers together with God	Committee of the Women's Inter-Church Council of Canada
1961	Forward through the Ages: In everything give thanks	United States of America
1962	For God So Loved the World	Uruguay
1963	More than Conquerors	Korea
1964	Let us Pray	Switzerland
1965	What doth the Lord require?	United States of America
1966	Ye are my Witnesses	WWDP Committee of Scotland
1967	Of His Kingdom there shall be no end	Tonga
1968	Bear ye one another's Burdens	Ceylon
1969	Growing Together in Christ	Sierra Leone Ghana; South Africa; Congo; Zambia; Kenya
1970	Be of Good Courage	Jamaica Egypt; United States of America; Philippines; Guyana
1971	A New People for a New Age	Caribbean
1972	All Joy Be Yours	Europe
1973	Alert in our time	New Zealand
1974	Make us builders of peace	Japan
1975	Become perfectly One	Egypt
1976	Education through Living	Mexico South America
1977	Love in Action	German Democratic Republic
1978	Community Spirit in Modern Living	Canada
1979	Spiritual Growth	East Africa
1980	Responsible Freedom	Thailand
1981	The Earth is the Lord's	USA
1982	The People of God: Gathered for Worship- Scattered for Service	Ireland Northern Ireland
1983	New persons in Christ	Caribbean
1984	Living Water from Christ our Hope	Sweden
1985	Peace through Prayer and Action	India
1986	Choose Life	Australia
1987	Come and Rejoice!	International Committee of WWDP
1988	Open Doors	Brazil
1989	Lord, Teach us to Pray	Burma
1990	A Better Tomorrow, Justice for All	Czechoslovakia
1991	On the Journey Together	Kenya
1992	Living Wisely with Creation	German Speaking Switzerland Austria; Germany
1993	God's People: Instruments of Healing	Guatemala
1994	Go, See & Act	Palestine
1995	The Earth is a House for all People	Ghana
1996	God Calls Us To Respond	Haiti
1997	Like a Seed Which Grows into a Tree	Korea
1998	Who is My Neighbour?	Madagascar
1999	God's Tender Touch	Venezuela
2000	Talitha Kumi: Young Woman Stand Up	Indonesia
2001	Informed Prayer, Prayerful Action	Samoa
2002	Challenged to Reconcile	Romania
2003	Holy Spirit, Fill Us	Lebanon
2004	In Faith, Women Shape the Future	Panama
2005	Let Our Light Shine	Poland
2006	Signs Of The Times	South Africa
2007	United Under God's Tent	Paraguay
2008	God's Wisdom Provides New Understanding	Guyana
2009	In Christ, There Are Many Members, Yet One Body	Papua New Guinea
2010	Let Everything that has Breath Praise God	Cameroon
2011	How Many Loaves Have You?	Chile
2012	Let Justice Prevail	Malaysia
2013	I was a Stranger and You Welcomed Me	France
2014	Streams in the Desert	Egypt
2015	Jesus Said to them: "Do You Know What I Have Done to you?"	The Bahamas
2016	Receive Children, Receive Me	Cuba
2017	Am I Being Unfair to You?	Philippines
2018	All God's Creation is Very Good!	Suriname
2019	Come – Everything is Ready	Slovenia
2020	Rise! Take your Mat and Walk	Zimbabwe
2021	Build on a Strong Foundation	Vanuatu
2022	I Know the Plans I Have For You	England Wales; Northern Ireland
2023	I Have Heard About Your Faith	Taiwan
2024	I Beg You... Bear With One Another in Love	Palestine
2025	I Made You Wonderful	Cook Islands
2026	I Will Give You Rest: Come	Nigeria

=== Forthcoming World Day of Prayer themes and writer countries ===
see

Year	Theme	Writer Country
2027	Centennial: United in Prayer for Justice and Peace!	Worldwide
2028	Leading the Way in Grace	Costa Rica
2029	Compassion Brings Healing	Italy
2030	As the Earth Rests, People Can Eat	Nepal
2031	A Sign of Faith	Jamaica

== See also ==
- Christian ecumenism
