= Persecution of Christians in the post–Cold War era =

The persecution of Christians from 1989 to the present is part of a global pattern of religious persecution. In this era, the persecution of Christians takes place in Africa, the Americas, Europe, Asia, and the Middle East.

== Prevalence ==
A July 2019 speech, in support of persecuted Christians, released by the UK's Secretary of State for Foreign and Commonwealth Affairs, claims that the number of countries where Christians suffer because of their faith rose from 125 in 2015 to 144 in 2016. The review prepared by the Bishop of Truro states that in some regions the level and nature of persecution is arguably coming close to meeting the International definition of genocide, according to the Genocide Convention, adopted by the United Nations.

Between 2007 and 2017, the PEW organization found that "Christians experienced harassment by governments or social groups in 144 countries". The United States submits an annual report on religious freedom to Congress, which also includes data on religious persecution collected from U.S. embassies worldwide, in collaboration with the Office of International Religious Freedom and other relevant U.S. government and non-governmental institutions. The data is listed by country and is available online.

== Americas ==
=== Bolivia ===
The Bolivian government has been criticized for not adequately protecting the rights of religious minorities, including Christians, and for failing to prosecute those responsible for attacks. There have been incidents of property damage and theft directed towards Christian organizations and individuals. The country also has a history of religious tolerance and diversity, and many Christians live and worship freely without incident.

=== Canada ===
In 2021, Christian churches in Canada were subject to numerous acts of arson and vandalism that resulted in the damage and destruction of 68 churches across the country.

Harsha Walia, the executive director of the British Columbia Civil Liberties Association, responded to reports of fires at indigenous Catholic parishes with a tweet on June 30 that read "burn it all down". The Union of British Columbia Indian Chiefs expressed support for her without mentioning the controversial tweet.

=== Chile ===
Since 2015, twelve churches have been burned in southern Chile, 10 Catholic ones and two Protestant ones. Attacks were supposedly carried out by the Mapuche indigenous people, who are campaigning to reclaim ancestral lands, according to authorities.

A note declaring "We are going to burn all churches" was found at the ruins of the Christian Union Evangelical church in Ercilla, Chile, after an arson attack on 31 March 2016.

=== Cuba ===
In Cuba, government regulations are aimed at curbing the growth of Christian house churches.

=== Mexico ===
Mexico is 83% Catholic, 5% Protestant, with some indigenous persons adhering to indigenous beliefs, 0.5% Jewish, and an even smaller number of Muslims and others. In March, authorities in San Miguel Chiptic, Chiapas State, threatened three indigenous families for converting from Catholicism to the Seventh-day Adventist Church and did significant damage to their properties. On 23 May, local police in San Miguel Chiptic arrested two Seventh-day Adventist men for preaching beliefs other than Catholicism. Evangelical Protestant leaders in the states of Chiapas and Oaxaca said local indigenous leaders pressured them to financially support and/or participate in Catholic events, convert, or return to Catholicism. In September, Christian Solidarity Worldwide reported that representatives from Rancheria Yocnajab, located in the Comitan de Dominguez municipality of Chiapas, did not allow the burial of an evangelical Protestant in the community public cemetery because she had not done so. The Catholic Multimedia Center reported that unidentified individuals killed seven priests and kidnapped another.

In most cases, attacks on and killings of Catholic priests generally reflect criminal activity rather than religious persecution. In August, the CMC asserted that Mexico was the most violent country for priests in Latin America for the 10th year in a row. In March, unidentified individuals detonated two homemade bombs in two Catholic churches in Matamoros, Tamaulipas. Christian Solidarity Worldwide reported that unidentified individuals killed four non-Catholic clergy.

== Africa ==
There are 54 countries in Africa, with many, but not all, experiencing some type of religious persecution.

=== Algeria ===
In Algeria, the official religion is Sunni Islam, and "those engaged in religious practice other than Sunni Islam, including Ahmadi Muslims, reported that they had experienced threats and intolerance. The police charged five Christians from Bouira Province with 'inciting a Muslim to change his religion' and 'performing religious worship in an unauthorized place.' In March 2018 a court in Tiaret convicted and fined two Christian brothers for carrying more than 50 Bibles in their car. In May another court convicted a church leader and another Christian of proselytizing, sentenced them to three months in prison, and fined them 100,000 dinars. Authorities closed eight churches and a nursery associated with the Protestant Church of Algeria (EPA). Media outlets reported vandalism of two Christian cemeteries".

=== Angola ===
In Angola, about two-fifths of the population is Roman Catholic, two-fifths is Protestant, and some one-tenth adheres to traditional beliefs or other religions. All religious groups are required to register with the government in order to operate legally. In October 2018, the government required all unregistered religious groups to submit registration documents, 94 submitted their files. On 6 November, the government launched a nationwide law enforcement campaign against which included closing down unlicensed associations. The operation closed more than 900 houses of worship, including eight mosques.

=== Burkina Faso ===
In Burkina Faso society is religiously diverse with a 60.5% Muslim majority. A number of terrorist groups operated in the country throughout the year of 2018. In April they kidnapped a public schoolteacher in the Sahel Region, because "French is the language of infidels and all education should be conducted in Arabic." In September they burned and vandalized several schools and teachers' houses in the East Region, warning against secular teaching. They kidnapped a Catholic catechist and a Christian pastor in the Sahel Region in May and June. In September unidentified individuals vandalized a Catholic church, removing the heads of religious statues in the southwest area of the country.

=== Burundi ===
Burundi 2018 "laws regulating nonprofit organizations and religious denominations require them to register with the Ministry of the Interior. Religious groups that do not seek or receive registration may face scrutiny, and at times harassment or prosecution, by government officials and ruling party members".

=== Cameroon ===
In Cameroon, Islam, Christianity, and Traditionalist are the three main religions. Religious groups must register with the government but the government has not allowed registrations for eight years. In 2018, religious leaders said security forces killed three clerics, interrupted church services, and prevented people from getting to their places of worship. On 18 January, soldiers reportedly burned down the presbytery of St. Paul's Catholic Church, Kwa-Kwa, Southwest Region. During the year, the government suspended church executives who had been elected by their churches and closed places of worship. Boko Haram attacked civilians, invaded churches, burned churches, killed and kidnapped both Muslims and Christians, and stole and destroyed property including private homes. Unidentified gunmen in the Southwest Region killed a local chief in a church and assassinated a priest. Separatists threatened pastors, kidnapped priests, and sometimes limited Christians' ability to attend services. There were reports that more than 90 students were kidnapped from Presbyterian schools in two incidents in October and November.

=== Central African Republic ===
In 2018, the Central African Republic is a majority Christian country that is also religiously diverse. In 2018, the government has limited control as the country is mostly controlled by the Christian anti-Balaka and the Muslim ex-Séléka militia forces who occupy territories in the western and northern parts of the country. The police and the gendarmerie (military police) failed to stop or punish killings, physical abuse, religion-based and gender-based violence committed by these militias. Sectarian clashes between the militias and the rest of the population included attacks on churches and mosques and the deaths at those places of worship.

In April and May, a joint government and UN operation to disarm a militia group in Bangui's predominantly Muslim PK5 neighborhood sparked violence. On 1 May, militia gunmen attacked and killed one priest, 26 worshipers, and injured more than 100 civilians. The following day, anti-Balaka elements burned two mosques in Bangui. On 15 November, a suspected ex-Seleka militia group set fire to the Catholic cathedral and an adjoining internally displaced person (IDP) camp in the city of Alindao, killing Bishop Blaise Mada and Reverend Delestin Ngouambango and more than 40 civilians.

=== Chad ===
In 2018, Chad's religious demography was 51–58% Muslim, 40–45% Christian, with small populations of animists and unaffiliated individuals. During the inauguration of the new government, two Christian ministers refused to swear the required oath of office in the name of Allah; one minister who refused to take any oath in the name of Allah was immediately fired by President Idriss Déby.

=== Democratic Republic of the Congo ===
The Democratic Republic of the Congo is approximately 45 percent Roman Catholic, 40 percent Protestant (including evangelicals), 5 percent Church of Jesus Christ on Earth through the Prophet Simon Kimbangu (Kimbanguist), and 5 percent Muslim. International NGOs, media, and religious organizations have reported that the government subjected religious organizations and leaders, most prominently Catholic, to intimidation, arbitrary arrest, and in some cases violence. Due to the political nature of many of the Catholic Lay Association's activities and practices; however, it is difficult to establish the government's response as being solely based on religious identity.

=== Egypt ===
About 90% of Egypt's population is Muslim, predominantly Sunni, while approximately 10% are Christian, predominantly Coptic Orthodox. Although Islam is Egypt's state religion, the government officially recognizes Christianity and Judaism, permitting their followers to practice publicly. Nevertheless, religious freedom in Egypt has faced significant challenges throughout centuries, including in recent history. The Egyptian government does not legally recognize conversions from Islam to Christianity, and missionary activities by foreigners are limited to social services rather than proselytizing. Historically, the community experienced significant tension during the presidency of Anwar Sadat, who internally exiled Coptic Pope Shenouda III in 1981 over accusations of stirring sectarian tensions. In 1985, Shenouda was restored by Sadat's successor Hosni Mubarak. Extremist Islamist groups, notably Al-Jama'a al-Islamiyya, heightened violence against Christians during the 1980s and 1990s, often with accusations of police complicity.

Following the 2011 Egyptian revolution, anti-Christian sentiment increased significantly amid the countrywide unrest. Incidents included church burnings, violence over the appointment of a Christian governor, and inflammatory anti-Christian rhetoric by Islamist groups. The European Parliament criticized Egypt in 2011 for persecuting Christians, and by mid-2012, around 10,000 Christians had emigrated. Violence escalated again in July 2012, when Dahshur's entire Christian community fled following sectarian clashes after a minor dispute spiraled into riots, resulting in destruction of property and violence against Christians.

On 9 October 2011, Cairo became the scene of the deadliest state-involved massacre of Copts in modern Egyptian history, known as the Maspero massacre. On that day, thousands of Coptic Christians marched to the Maspero Television Building, the headquarters of the National Media Authority, Egypt's state and public television broadcaster, administered by the Egyptian government. The peaceful protest, whose participants demonstrated against the authorities’ failure to investigate the destruction of an Aswan church and related sectarian attacks, was first attacked by unknown assailants who threw bottles and rocks at the protesters, which was followed by a coordinated assault by Egypt's military and security forces, whose troops shot live ammunition at the demonstrators and intentionally ran civilians over with APC’s. As a result, 28 Copts were killed, and hundreds were severely injured.

Kidnappings for ransom of Christians became widespread after the revolution, particularly in Minya, with over 150 cases reported between 2011 and 2013. Tensions have persisted over church construction, despite legal permissions being available; attempts to build or renovate churches frequently provoke hostility and sometimes violent attacks from local Muslim communities.

Egypt's laws on contempt of religion have also been controversial. In 2016, poet Fatima Naoot received a three-year sentence for a Facebook post criticizing animal slaughter during Eid. In the same year, four Christian teenagers were convicted under the same laws for reportedly mocking Islam, with three sentenced to five years' imprisonment.

Nonetheless, recent years have shown signs of progress in certain areas. Christians have reported greater freedom to construct and renovate churches, and new initiatives, such as interreligious reconciliation efforts and protective fatwas, have emerged. Egypt's position on Open Doors' World Watch List, which ranks the 50 countries where Christians face the most persecution, fell from 25th in 2013 to 40th by 2025, indicating a measurable decline in reported persecution. However, social discrimination and underrepresentation in public institutions continue to affect the community.

=== Eritrea ===
Eritrea's population is equally divided between the predominantly Christian high plateau (Asmara) and the Muslim lowlands and coast. The government recognizes four officially registered religious groups: the Eritrean Orthodox Church, Sunni Islam, the Roman Catholic Church, and the Evangelical Lutheran Church of Eritrea. Unregistered groups can be subjected to additional security service scrutiny. The government appoints the heads of the Eritrean Orthodox Church and the Sunni Islamic community. International NGOs and media reported that members of all religious groups were subjected to government abuses and restrictions. Members of unrecognized religious groups reported instances of imprisonment and deaths in custody, and detention without explanation. NGOs reported the government continued to detain 345 church leaders and officials without charge or trial, while estimates of detained laity ranged from 800 to more than 1,000. Authorities detained 53 Jehovah's Witnesses for conscientious objection.

=== Ethiopia ===
Ethiopia has 43.5% Ethiopian Orthodox Christians, 33.9% Muslim, 18.6%, Protestants, and 2.6% traditional beliefs population. There is also a small Jewish community and some adherents of the Baháʼí Faith. In January 2018, security forces fired tear gas at a group of youth singing politically charged messages in Woldia town during Epiphany celebrations. The local Human Rights Council (HRCO) reported that security forces shot and killed eight Orthodox Church members; this was followed by further protests and more killings. On 4 August, in the Somali region, an organized group of Muslim youth reportedly killed six priests and burned down at least eight Ethiopian Orthodox churches during widespread civil unrest in Jijiga. On 25 August, in Bure town, followers of the Ethiopian Orthodox Church stoned a man to death after accusing him of attempting to set a church on fire.

=== Kenya ===
In 2026, according to statistical data and censuses, Kenya's population remains religiously diverse, with Christians comprising the majority of its citizens (approximately 80% of the country's population). 38.2% of Kenya's population identifies as Protestant, 25.6% as Roman Catholic, 16.2% as independent Christians, 10.5% as Muslim, and 9.5% as either Baháʼí, Buddhist, Hindu, or adherents of traditional religions. Additionally, Kenya is home to the world's largest Quaker community, with the country's more than 120,000 adherents representing around one-third of the world's Quakers. With several estimates placing its membership between 300,000 and 1 million adherents, the Eastern Orthodox Church in Kenya, officially under the direct jurisdiction of the Greek Orthodox Patriarchate of Alexandria, is home to Africa's largest Eastern Orthodox Church community, and its Orthodox community is considered one of the fastest-growing on the African continent.

In the post-Cold War era, Christians in Kenya have experienced recurring waves of targeted violence, bombings, executions, and systemic intimidation, perpetrated by Islamic terrorists (predominantly by the Somalia-based jihadist organization al-Shabaab), domestic cells of radicalized Islamists, and community mobs, with the majority of the attacks and violence concentrated in the northeastern border counties (Mandera, Garissa, Wajir) and the coastal region (Lamu, Mombasa). Over the past decades, al-Shabaab's jihadists have frequently crossed the Kenya–Somalia border and carried out terrorist attacks, bombings, kidnappings, and mass shootings across Kenya, targeting non-Muslims in particular.

On 15 and 17 June 2014, several dozens of armed al-Shabaab extremists assaulted a predominantly Christian coastal town of Mpeketoni as well as two nearby villages of Majembeni and Poromoko in Lamu County. According to the testimonies of several eyewitnesses who survived the Mpeketoni attacks, around 50 perpetrators deliberately targeted Christian residents, as they went door-to-door to ask residents their religion before executing around 60 people, almost all of whom were Christian men.

On 2 April 2015, al-Shabaab carried out the Garissa University College attack, which has been Kenya's most lethal anti-Christian attack and the second deadliest terrorist attack in the country's modern history (only surpassed by the 1998 United States embassy bombings), resulting in 142 students being murdered. After four heavily armed assailants stormed the Garissa University College, they proceeded to single out Christian students, as they explicitly selected them for execution.

In September 2018, al-Shabaab reportedly stopped a bus in Lamu County and killed two Christian travelers. In October 2018, a group of residents in Bungale, Magarini Sub-County, burned and demolished a Good News International Ministries church. Additionally, Kenya's Christians have experienced religiously motivated threats from the country's Muslim communities on numerous occasions, as its radicalized members have regularly threatened individuals who converted from Islam to Christianity. According to religious leaders, some Muslim youths vandalized the properties of local Christians.

=== Libya ===
Sunni Islam is the state religion and sharia is the principal source of legislation. Non-Muslim activity remains curtailed by legal prohibitions. Circulation of non-Islamic religious materials, missionary activity, or speech considered "offensive to Muslims" is prohibited. Multiple international human rights organizations said Christians faced a heightened risk of physical assault, including sexual assault and rape, than other migrants and refugees at government detention centers. Some detainees reported they were tortured and abused. Domestic human rights activists continued to report a restrictive environment, especially toward women, imposing restrictions on women's dress and movement and punishing men for behavior they deemed un-Islamic.

Between 1969 and 2011, Libya (then known as the Libyan Arab Republic) was ruled by Muammar Gaddafi's dictatorship. In 1973, Gaddafi officially suspended Libya's existing laws and declared Sharia law the country's fundamental basis, while in 1977, his Declaration on the Establishment of the Authority of the People formally established the Quran as the "constitution" of Libya. For indigenous Libyans, religious freedom did not exist, and leaving Islam to convert to Christianity remained completely illegal and highly dangerous under state security surveillance. However, his heavy-handed, authoritarian, and highly centralized government also effectively suppressed the tribal fractionalization and Islamic extremism. This environment of strict law and order enabled Libyan Christians and foreigners of the Christian faith to practice their religion openly in designated, authorized church buildings, without fear of harassment or terror attacks.

When Gaddafi's totalitarian regime was overthrown in 2011, the heavy-handed state apparatus that had kept violent Islamic extremism locked away collapsed with it, which resulted in directly exposing the country's Christian population to the rise of unchecked jihadist groups like ISIS and Ansar al-Sharia. Since the 2011 Libyan civil war, the number of attacks on Christians in Libya has skyrocketed, with February 2015's kidnapping and beheading of 21 Coptic Christians and April 2015's shooting and beheading of two groups of Christian migrant workers (the majority of whom were Ethiopian Christians) by ISIS gaining international notoriety.

The East operated under a separate, unrecognized governmental administration, with security provided by the Libyan National Army (LNA) and LNA-aligned Salafist armed groups. Militias continued to operate and control territory throughout the country, including in Benghazi, parts of Tripoli, and Derna, where there were numerous reports of armed groups restricting religious practices, enforcing compliance with sharia, and targeting those viewed as violating their standards. According to Open Doors USA, Islamic militant groups and organized crime groups targeted religious minorities, including Christian migrants, converts to Christianity, and foreign residents for physical attacks, sexual assaults, detentions, kidnappings, and killings. Foreign terrorist organizations that included Ansar al-Sharia, al-Qaida in the Maghreb (AQIM), and ISIS continued to operate within the country. In December 2018, the Reuters news service reported that local authorities said they had exhumed from a mass grave near Sirte the bodies of 34 Ethiopian Christians executed by ISIS in 2015. According to international media, former Muslims faced intense social and economic pressure to renounce their Christian faith and return to Islam.

=== Nigeria ===
Over the past decades, the situation for Nigeria's Christian community has deteriorated so rapidly and extensively that it has triggered responses on the international level, and the persecution of the country's Christians has assumed the scale of a national emergency. Since 2009, a radical Islamist organization, Boko Haram, has waged a violent insurgency aimed at establishing an Islamic state in Nigeria. University of Johannesburg law professor Werner Nicolaas Nel has noted that this has resulted in the persecution of Christians in Nigeria. There has been a tendency to "mischaracterise the situation as civil conflict". The number of Nigerian Christians killed for their identification as Christians accounts for 70% of those being killed for their faith worldwide. In 2020, the academic Journal of African Studies and Sustainable Development published a paper that noted that since 2015, over 12,000 Christians have been killed in Nigeria. Later, Global Christian Relief citing a 2023 report by the non-government International Society for Civil Liberties and Rule of Law (Intersociety), claimed that 52,250 Christians were murdered for their faith in the previous fourteen years, alongside 34,000 "moderate Muslims". In 2025, this garnered international attention with United States president Donald Trump vowing military action in Nigeria if the attacks against Christians did not subside. However, the Armed Conflict Location & Event Data Project (ACLED) in 2025 documented that it was a total of 53,000 Muslims and Christians that had been killed in targeted political violence from 2009–2025. And in 2025 of these 1,923 attacks on civilians that occurred in Nigeria, 50 of them were specifically targeted based on their religion. In September 2026, BBC Africa Eye released a documentary which highlighted that the reality on the ground is more complicated than narratives used to drive US-foreign policy. The insecurity was attributed to government state failure, competition over resources, and tribal tensions rather than just religious based violence.

On 25 December 2011, Boko Haram jihadists conducted a series of coordinated attacks with explosive devices and firearms on churches in Madalla, Jos, Gadaka, and Damaturu during Christmas Day church services, resulting in the deaths of at least 39 Christian worshipers. The most lethal of them was the bombing attack on Saint Theresa Catholic Church in Madalla, where 35 people were murdered, and an additional 52 were wounded when the Islamic terrorists detonated the bomb on Christmas morning at around 8:00 am. The attack's high death toll was also a result of the authorities' inability to promptly dispatch enough emergency medical personnel and first aid to ensure the necessary life-saving medical treatment for all the critically wounded individuals.

On 5 June 2022, a mass shooting and bomb attack occurred at a Catholic church in the city of Owo in Ondo State, as a group of gunmen entered the church disguised as congregants, carrying bags that contained firearms, while another group took positions outside the church, where it planted Improvised explosive devices. In what became known as the Owo church attack, between 40 and 50 Christians were murdered when bombs were detonated, and both groups began firing on worshippers who were attending a mass and celebrating Pentecost. While numerous Owo locals accused the radicalized members of the Hausa and Fulani herdsmen groups of complicity, the federal government of Nigeria stated that Islamic extremists from the Islamic State – West Africa Province were behind the attack.

On 13 June 2025, one of the deadliest acts of violence against Nigerian Christians took place in the village of Yelwata, a farming community in Benue State's Guma County. A heavily armed group of Fulani Islamists stormed a community that sheltered hundreds of civilians, who had already been displaced by earlier raids, set fire to the buildings in which families slept, and indiscriminately shot at all those who tried to flee. While Amnesty International's representatives put the attack's death toll put the attack's death toll at more than 100, Truth Nigeria, a U.S.-registered online media organization that reports on the persecution of Christians in Nigeria, claimed that, according to their representatives' investigation, the number of murdered civilians exceeded 200.

As the situation of Nigeria's Christian community gradually worsened, the international community has become increasingly alarmed by the deteriorating conditions of the country's Christians, with the United States government's actions being particularly strong and impactful. In December 2020, after years of pressure from the United States Commission on International Religious Freedom, which cited the Nigerian government's failure to adequately address systematic, ongoing, and egregious violations of religious freedom, the U.S. Department of State officially designated Nigeria as a country of particular concern for the first time, based on the International Religious Freedom Act of 1998's authorities. The Biden administration removed the country from the list in November 2021; however, it was reinstated in October 2025, in the first year of Donald Trump's second presidency. On 25 December 2025, in coordination with the Nigerian government, the United States Armed Forces launched targeted airstrikes against Islamic State – West Africa Province militants in northwest Nigeria.

=== South Africa ===
In April 2025, American missionary Josh Sullivan was abducted at gunpoint during a church service in Motherwell, a township near Gqeberha in South Africa's Eastern Cape province. Sullivan, who had been working in the region since 2018 as a church-planting missionary to Xhosa-speaking communities, was taken by at least four armed men, prompting a ransom demand. Following a coordinated response by South Africa's elite police unit, the Hawks, he was rescued unharmed on 15 April during a shoot-out in KwaMagxaki that resulted in the deaths of three suspects. The incident highlighted a broader trend of increased kidnappings for ransom in South Africa in the 2010s and 2020s. Sullivan's case drew international attention and sparked widespread calls for prayer and support from faith communities in both South Africa and the United States.

=== Somalia ===
Christians in Somalia face persecution associated with the ongoing civil war in that country.

In September 2011, militants sworn to eradicate Christianity from Somalia beheaded two Christian converts. A third Christian convert was beheaded in Mogadishu in early 2012.

=== Sudan ===
Some interpretations of Muslim law in Sudan refuse to recognize conversions out of Islam, considering apostasy a crime, and refuse to recognize marriages to non-Muslims. Sudan is one of the nations where being a Christian is hardest in the world. Freedom of religion and belief is systematically violated.

== Asia ==
=== Afghanistan ===
In Afghanistan in 2006, Abdul Rahman, a 41-year-old citizen, was charged with rejecting Islam because he converted to Catholicism, a crime which is punishable by death under Sharia law. Under intense pressure from Western governments, he was allowed to leave Afghanistan at the end of March 2006 and since then, he has been living in exile in Italy. In 2008, the Taliban killed a British charity worker, Gayle Williams, "because she was working for an organization which was preaching Christianity in Afghanistan" even though she was extremely careful and she did not try to convert Afghans to Christianity.

=== China ===
In the Xi Jinping era, some estimates put the number of Christians in China at 100 million, but it has been claimed in 2019 that 20 million of them faced persecution, including crackdowns, raids and church closures. Claims of persecution of Chinese Christians occurred in both official and unsanctioned churches.

=== India ===
There have been instances of religious intolerance and persecution of Christians in India, particularly in certain areas of the country. In recent years, there have been reports of violence and discrimination against Christians, as well as forced conversions, mainly by Hindu nationalist groups. The Indian government has been criticized by some international human rights organizations and religious groups for not doing enough to protect the rights of religious minorities, including Christians.

=== Indonesia ===
Indonesia is the world's largest Muslim-majority country, and while the constitution guarantees freedom of religion, there have been instances of religious intolerance and persecution of religious minorities, including Christians. In some areas of the country, particularly in more conservative regions, local laws and regulations have been used to restrict the religious freedom of minority groups. Additionally, there have been incidents of violence and intimidation directed at religious minorities, including Christians, by extremist groups. However, the overall situation varies widely across the country, with some areas being relatively peaceful while others experience significant religious tension.

=== Malaysia ===
In Malaysia, although Islam is the official religion, Christianity is tolerated under Article 3 and Article 11 of the Malaysian constitution. But at some point, the spread of Christianity is a particular sore point for the Muslim majority, the Malaysian government has also persecuted Christian groups who were perceived to be attempting to proselytize Muslim audiences. Those showing interest in the Christian faith or other faith practices not considered orthodox by state religious authorities are usually sent either by the police or their family members to state funded Faith Rehabilitation Centres (Malay: Pusat Pemulihan Akidah) where they are counseled to remain faithful to Islam and some states have provisions for penalties under their respective Shariah legislations for apostasy from Islam.

It has been the practice of the church in Malaysia to not actively proselytize to the Muslim community. Christian literature is required by law to carry a caption "for non-Muslims only". Article 11(4) of the Federal Constitution of Malaysia allows the states to prohibit the propagation of other religions to Muslims, and most (with the exception of Penang, Sabah, Sarawak and the Federal Territories) have done so. There is no well-researched agreement on the actual number of Malaysian Muslim converts to Christianity in Malaysia. According to the latest population census released by the Malaysian Statistics Department, there are none, according to Ustaz Ridhuan Tee, they are 135 and according to Tan Sri Dr Harussani Zakaria, they are 260,000. See also Status of religious freedom in Malaysia.

There are, however, cases in which a Muslim will adopt the Christian faith without declaring apostasy openly. In effect, they are practicing Christians, but legally Muslims.

=== North Korea ===
The government of North Korea is officially atheist, and any religious practices are strictly controlled and heavily monitored by the state. Those who are found to be practicing Christianity or any other religion can face severe punishment, including imprisonment, torture, and execution. The government also actively seeks to root out and punish individuals who are suspected of being involved in underground Christian activities. The country is considered as one of the worst places in the world for religious freedom by several human rights and Christian organizations.

=== Pakistan ===
Christians in Pakistan are a minority, making up 1.6% of the population, and religious minorities are frequently discriminated against. The Pakistan blasphemy law mandates that blasphemy of the Qur'an is to be punished. Critics of the laws say that Christians like Asia Bibi are sentenced to death with only hearsay for evidence of alleged blasphemy. At least a dozen Christians have been given death sentences, and half a dozen of them have been murdered after being accused of violating blasphemy laws. In 2005, 80 Christians were behind bars due to these laws.

Christians in Pakistan have been murdered in outbreaks of communal violence, such as the 2009 Gojra riots, and they have been targeted by militant groups, with the Peshawar church attack killing 75 Christians in Peshawar in 2013, and the Lahore church bombings killing 15 Christians in 2015. The campaign of violence by the Tehrik-i-Taliban Pakistan has been described as a genocide.

=== Sri Lanka ===
Christians in Sri Lanka are a minority, making up around 7.4% of the population as of the 2011 census. The Christian population faces sporadic outbreaks of violence and hostility by extremists. Churches have been vandalized by mobs organized by supporters of religious nationalist groups, such as Hindu supporters of Rashtriya Swayamsevak Sangh, Buddhist supporters of Bodu Bala Sena and Islamist supporters of National Thowheeth Jama'ath.

== Middle East ==
=== Iraq and Syria ===
The consolidation of power in the hands of Shia Islamists in Iraq since the overthrow of Saddam Hussein's regime has been detrimental to Iraq's Assyrian and Armenian Christian communities. Friction between rival sects in Iraq has frequently resulted in acts of violence against Christians in the country. Consequently, Christians have fled from some areas of Iraq and emigrated to Europe and the United States. Since 2003, hundreds of thousands of Christians have fled from Iraq, and as a result, the Christian population, which may have numbered as high as 1.4 million prior to the Iraq War, has dropped to 500,000, and the number of Christians who are currently living in Iraq is continuing to decline. Between 2003 and 2012, more than 70 churches were bombed. In 2007, Al Qaeda militants killed a young priest in Mosul, and in 2010, gunmen massacred 53 Assyrian Christians in a Baghdad church.

During the Syrian Civil War and its spillover into Iraq, the persecution of Christians by ISIL and other militant groups has been ongoing. The Fall of Mosul and the fall of the Assyrian town of Qaraqosh during the 2014 ISIL advance in Iraq caused the displacement of an estimated 100,000 Assyrian Christian civilians. After the fall of Mosul, ISIL decreed that if the Assyrian Christians who lived in the city did not convert to Islam or pay tribute, they would be executed. ISIL begun marking homes of Christian residents with the letter nūn for Nassarah ('Christian'). Thousands of Christians, Yazidis (the latter were only given the choice of conversion or death) and other, mostly Shi'a Muslims (who ISIL considers apostates) have abandoned their homes and land. One of the cultural heritage sites which was destroyed by ISIL was Mosque of the Prophet Jonah, a site which is considered holy by adherents of all Abrahamic faiths.

=== Israel and Palestine ===
==== Green Line Israel ====
In Tel Aviv in 2008, three teenagers burned hundreds of Christian Bibles. In a 2008 Tel Aviv incident, hundreds of copies of the New Testament, which had been handed out in the city (allegedly by Messianic Jews in order to convert Ethiopian Jews), were burned by three teenage Orthodox students of Judaism. Uzi Aharon, the town's deputy mayor, told CNN he had collected the New Testaments but that he did not plan for them to be burned. The youths had done so while he was not present. Once he found out that the fire was going, he put it out.

In Jerusalem, there have been instances of Christian churches and monasteries being vandalized with spray-painted offensive remarks against Christianity, including death threats. These are believed to be price tag attacks by extremist settlers.

A number of Ultra-Orthodox/Haredi youth have reportedly spat at Christian clergymen. Archbishop Aris Shirvanian, of Jerusalem's Armenian Patriarchate, says he personally has been spat at about 50 times in the past 12 years. The Anti-Defamation League has called on the chief Rabbis to speak out against the interfaith assaults. Father Goosan, Chief Dragoman of the Armenian Patriarchate of Jerusalem, stated that, "I know there are fanatical Haredi groups that don't represent the general public but it's still enraging. It all begins with education. It's the responsibility of these men's yeshiva heads to teach them not to behave this way".

In July 2012, a former member of the Knesset, Michael Ben-Ari, who supports Kahanism, videotaped himself tearing up a copy of the New Testament and throwing it in the trash. Ben-Ari referred to it as a "despicable book" that should be "in the dustbin of history". In response, the American Jewish Committee urged the Knesset to censure Ben-Ari, while a spokesman for Benjamin Netanyahu also condemned Ben-Ari's actions.

In June 2015, an auxiliary building of the Church of the Multiplication was significantly damaged by an arson attack and its walls defaced by Hebrew graffiti, bearing the words "the false gods will be eliminated" (quoted from the Aleinu prayer).

From 2018 to 2023, a total of 157 attacks on Christian sanctities in Israel by extremist Jews were documented.

In March 2023, Member of the Knesset Moshe Gafni submitted a bill that would have banned proselytizing of Christianity in Israel.

In June and July 2023, Jewish extremists repeatedly stormed a Catholic church and monastery in Haifa, leading to protests by the local Christians and clashes at the site between them and the extremists.

==== Jerusalem ====
Armenians in Jerusalem, identified as Palestinian Christians or Israeli-Armenians, have also been attacked and received threats from Jewish extremists; Christians and clergy have been spat at, and one Armenian Archbishop was beaten and his centuries-old cross broken. In September 2009, two Armenian Christian clergy were expelled after a brawl erupted with a Jewish extremist for spitting on holy Christian objects.

In January 2010, Christian leaders, Israeli Foreign ministry staff, representatives of the Jerusalem municipality and the Haredi community met to discuss inter-faith tolerance. The Haredi Community Tribunal of Justice published a statement condemning harassment of Christians, stating that it was a "desecration of God's name". Several events were planned in 2010 by the Orthodox Yedidya congregation to show solidarity with Christians and improve relations between the Haredi and Christian communities of Jerusalem.

==== West Bank ====
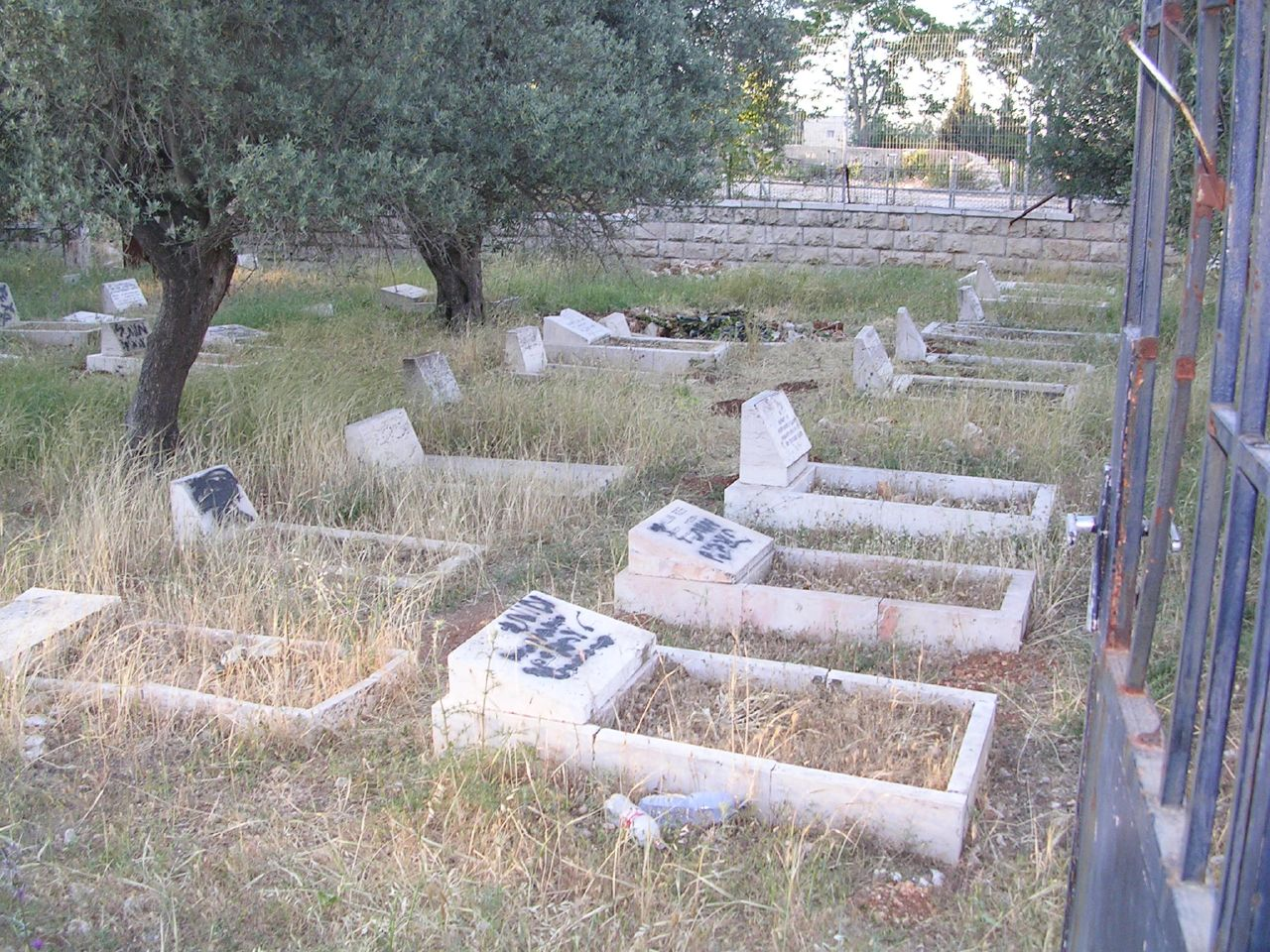
A vandalized Christian graveyard in Bethlehem. The text says "Death to Arabs" in Hebrew.

In May 2023, a few months before the Gaza genocide, a report titled "Palestinian Christians - The Forcible Displacement and Dispossession Continues" was released by Kairos Palestine, a Palestinian Christian advocacy group, based in the West Bank.

In 2002, a mob of Palestinian Muslims burned Christian property in Ramallah. A dossier submitted in 2005 to Church leaders in Jerusalem listed 93 incidents of abuse alleged to have been committed against Palestinian Christians by Muslim extremists and 140 cases of gangs allegedly stealing Christian land in the West Bank.

In September 2005, hundreds of Muslim men from Deir Jarir torched homes in Taybeh in response to an affair between a 30-year-old Muslim woman from Deir Jarir said to have been romantically involved with a Christian man from Taybeh. Taybeh residents called the authorities to intervene, the Israelis arrived first but they watched and did not intervene. Palestinian policemen arriving from Ramallah were held at an Israeli checkpoint for three hours, and were only allowed to pass after constant calls from the U.S. consulate in Jerusalem. Despite the incident, the neighboring towns continue to have healthy relations; residents say "the people of Taybeh and the people of Deir Jarir are one family". In May 2012 a group of 100 Muslims attacked Taybeh, a Christian village in the West Bank. On 19 April 2013, Israeli settlers attempted to take over Taybeh's monastery and its adjacent chapel. Both before and during the 2023 Gaza war, Israeli settlers conducted violent attacks and arson in Taybeh.

On Christmas Day in 2023, Israel raided Bethlehem, where many Palestinian Christians live. In 2006, a Zogby poll that interviewed more than 1,000 Palestinian Christians from Bethlehem found that 79% of the respondents cited the Israeli occupation as source of difficulties leading the emigration of their community.

==== Gaza Strip ====
The Hamas overthrow of the Palestinian Authority in Gaza in 2007 was accompanied by violent attacks against Christians and Christian holy sites by Islamic militants. A Catholic convent and Rosary Sisters school were ransacked, with some Christians blaming Hamas for the attack. In September 2007 Christian anxiety grew after an 80-year-old Christian woman was attacked in her Gaza home by a masked man who robbed her and called her an kafir. The library of YMCA was bombed in 2008 by gunmen who, according to guards at the site, asked why the guards worked for "infidels".

Gazan Salafi jihadist militant groups are opposed to Christianity and have attacked Christian targets. In 2007, Jaish al Mu'minun carried out the murder of Rami Ayyad, an affiliate of the Gaza Baptist Church who managed the only Christian bookstore in the Gaza Strip. Other Salafi jihadist groups that have attacked Gazan Christians include Jaysh al-Islam and Tawhid al-Jihad.

In 2011, some Gazan Christians interviewed by The Guardian reported an anti-Christian atmosphere in Gaza. Reportedly, people were not celebrating Christmas out of fear; young Christian men were emigrating en masse; a Hamas official had detained and threatened a Christian wearing a cross necklace; and many Christians wanted the Palestinian Authority to retake Gaza.

In 2012, tensions arose between Gazan Christians and Hamas after it was alleged that five Christians had been kidnapped and forced to convert to Islam. The Muslim Scholars’ Association in Palestine, Hamas, and the converts themselves stated they had not been kidnapped or forcibly converted to Islam, but Gazan Christians remained skeptical, and began organizing near-daily protest rallies in Gaza City. The Palestinian Center for Human Rights met with and interviewed the converts, and concluded that they had converted out of their own free will.

All three churches in Gaza have been subjected to attacks by the Israel Defense Forces (IDF) during the Gaza war, and around 3% of Gazan Christians have been killed by Israeli airstrikes or shootings. The Gaza Baptist Church was heavily damaged sometime in 2023. In December 2023, two Gazan Christians, Naheda Anton and her daughter Samar Anton were shot and killed at the Holy Family Church by an Israeli sniper, and the church itself was targeted by tank fire in July 2025. The Rosary Sisters' school was bombed in November 2023, and the Holy Family Catholic school was bombed in July 2024. The Church of Saint Porphyrius was bombed in October 2023 and again in July 2024.

==== Media in Palestine ====
Palestinian Media Watch (PMW) reported that state-controlled Palestinian media frequently demonize religions like Judaism and Christianity. PMW translated into English a children's television program aired twice in 2012 it said featured a young girl saying Jews and Christians are "cowardly and despised".

=== Lebanon ===
==== Lebanese public diplomacy ====
Former Lebanese president Amine Gemayel stated in 2011 that Christians had become the target of genocide after dozens of Christians were killed in deadly attacks in Egypt and Iraq.

=== Saudi Arabia ===
The human rights advocacy group International Christian Concern (ICC) informed the Christian Post that in December 2011, 35 Christian Ethiopians – both men and women – were violently arrested in Jeddah while they were holding a prayer meeting in their home. The prisoners stated that they were persecuted on account of their faith and they also stated that they were also pressured to convert to Islam, and the women stated that they were forced to undergo a humiliating strip search. According to ICC, one prisoner said, "The Muslim preacher [that was sent by officials to speak to the prisoners] vilified Christianity, denigrated the Bible and told us that Islam is the only true religion."

=== Turkey ===
The Ecumenical Patriarchate of Constantinople is still in a difficult position. Turkish law requires the Ecumenical Patriarch to be an ethnic Greek who holds Turkish citizenship since birth, although most members of Turkey's Greek minority have been expelled. The state's expropriation of church property is an additional difficulty faced by the Church of Constantinople. In November 2007, a 17th-century chapel of Our Lord's Transfiguration at the Halki seminary was almost totally demolished by the Turkish forestry authority. There was no advance warning given for the demolition work and it was only stopped after appeals were filed by the Ecumenical Patriarch.

The difficulties currently experienced by the Assyrians and Armenian Orthodox minorities in Turkey are the result of an anti-Armenian and anti-Christian attitude which is espoused by ultra-nationalist groups such as the Grey Wolves. According to the Minority Rights Group, the Turkish government recognizes Armenians and Assyrians as minorities but in Turkey, this term is used to denote second-class status.

In February 2006, Father Andrea Santoro was murdered in Trabzon. On 18 April 2007 in the Zirve Publishing House, Malatya, Turkey. Three employees of the Bible publishing house were attacked, tortured and murdered by five Sunni Muslim assailants.

=== Yemen ===
The Christian presence in Yemen dates back to the fourth century AD when a number of Himyarites embrace Christianity due to the efforts of Theophilos the Indian. Currently, there are no official statistics on their numbers, but they are estimated to be between 3,000 and 25,000 people, and most of them are either refugees or temporary residents. Freedom of worship, conversion from Islam and establishing facilities dedicated for worship are not recognized as rights in the country's Constitution and laws. At the same time, Wahabbi activities linked to Al-Islah was being facilitated, financed and encouraged from multiple fronts including the Ministry of Endowments and Guidance, which says that its tasks "to contribute to the development of Islamic awareness and circulation of the publication Education and Islamic morals and consolidation in the life of public and private citizens."

The Missionaries of Charity founded by Mother Teresa has worked in Aden since 1992, and it has three other centers in Sanaa, Taiz and Hodeidah. Three Catholic nuns were killed in Hodeidah in 1998, two of them from India and the third from the Philippines. The nuns died at the hands of a member of Al-Islah named Abdullah al-Nashiri, who argued that they were calling Muslims to convert to Christianity. In 2002, three Americans were killed in Baptists Hospital at the hands of another Al-Islah member named Abed Abdul Razak Kamel. Survivors say that the suspect (Al-Islah) was "a political football" who had been raised by Islamists, who talked about it often in mosques and who described hospital workers as "spies". But they emphasized that these views are only held by a minority of Yemenis. In December 2015, an old Catholic church in Aden was destroyed.

Since the escalation of the Yemeni crisis in March 2015, six priests from John Bosco remained, and twenty workers for charitable missions in the country, described by Pope Francis by the courage to fortitude amid war and conflict. He called the Apostolic Vicar of Southern Arabia to pray for all the oppressed and tortured, expelled from their homes, and killed unjustly. In all cases, regardless of the values and ethics of the warring forces in Yemen on religious freedom, it is proved that the Missionaries of Charity were not active in the field of evangelization according to the testimonies of beneficiaries of its services. On 4 March 2016, Missionaries of Charity operation in Aden was attacked, resulting in 16 deaths.

== Europe ==
=== Norway ===
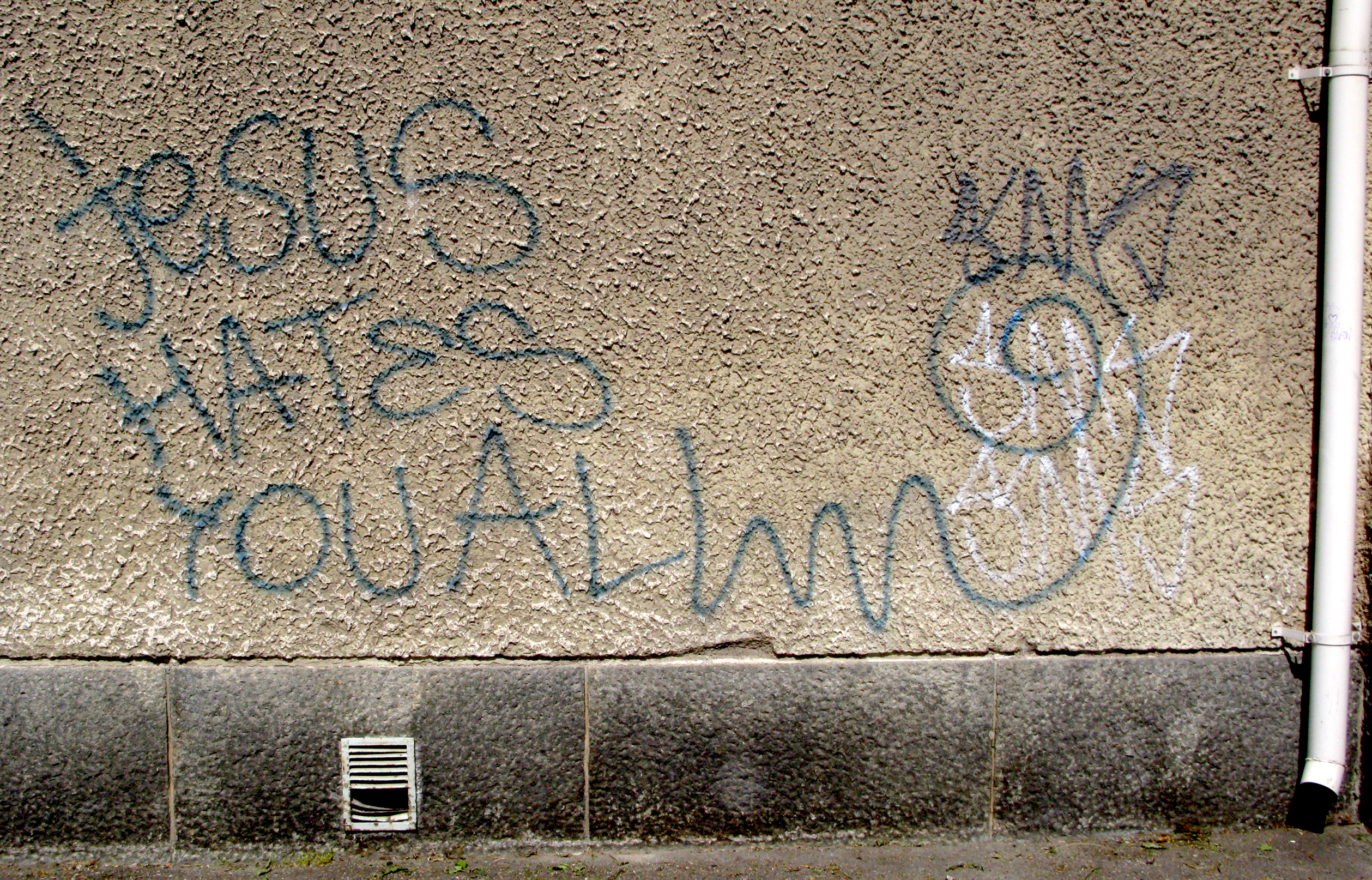
Anti-Christian graffiti in Tampere, Finland

In June 1992, the Fantoft Stave Church was burnt down. It was a wooden church originally built in 1150 in Fortun and moved to Bergen in 1883. At first the fire was attributed to lightning and electrical failure. In January 1993 Varg Vikernes, also known as "Count Grishnackh", was interviewed by a local journalist in his apartment decorated with 'Nazi paraphernalia, weapons and Satanic symbols'. Vikernes, at the time a proponent of White nationalism, social conservatism, survivalism and his völkisch-inspired ideology, declared that he wanted to blow up Blitz House and Nidaros Cathedral. He has publicly supported black metal fans burning down eight churches in Norway. He used a photo of the charred remnants of one church taken soon after the fire on his band Burzum's EP entitled Aske (Norwegian for 'ashes'). Following his statement, the Norwegian authorities began to clamp down on black metal musicians.

In 1994, Vikernes was found guilty of murder, arson and possession of illegal weapons, including explosives, and given the maximum sentence under Norwegian law of 21 years in prison. He was released in 2009.

The following is a partial list of Norwegian Christian church arsons in 1992 by anti-Christian groups reported by English-language media sources:

- 23 May 1992: Storetveit Church in Bergen Municipality.
- 1 August: Revheim Church in Stavanger Municipality.
- 21 August: Holmenkollen Chapel in Oslo Municipality.
- 1 September: Ormøy Church in Oslo Municipality.
- 13 September: Skjold Church in Vindafjord Municipality. Varg Vikernes and Samoth were convicted.
- October: Hauketo Church in Oslo Municipality.
- 24 December: Åsane Church in Bergen Municipality. Varg Vikernes and musician Jørn Inge Tunsberg were convicted.
- 25 December: a Methodist church in Sarpsborg Municipality. A firefighter was killed while fighting the fire.

=== Russia ===
Many attacks, arsons and acts of vandalism against churches in Russia are reported each year. The acts of vandalism are often accompanied by Satanic symbolism and graffiti. In many instances, icons and crosses are burned and vandalized, and swastikas and Satanic symbols are painted on the walls of churches (while other attacks on churches in Russia are simply robberies). Some of the attacks on the churches, such as the cutting down of crosses, appear to be conducted by groups organized online and by local youth.

== See also ==
- International Day of Prayer for the Persecuted Church
- Anti-Catholicism
- Anti-Christian sentiment
- Anti-clericalism
- Anti-Mormonism
- Anti-Protestantism
- Christianity in the 21st century
- Christmas controversy
- Decline of Christianity in the Western world
- Religion and politics
- Religious violence
- Sectarian violence

Related topics

- Anti-Judaism
- Antisemitism
- Anti-Zionism
- Christianity and other religions
- Christianity and politics
- Christianity and violence
- History of Christianity
- History of Christian thought on persecution and tolerance
- Role of Christianity in civilization
- Hindu terrorism
  - Hindutva
  - Hindu nationalism
- Islamophobia
  - Islamophobic trope
  - Islamophobia in the media
- Persecution of Christians
- Persecution of Eastern Orthodox Christians
- Persecution of Hazara people
- Persecution of Jehovah's Witnesses
- Persecution of Jews
- Persecution of Muslims
- Sectarian violence among Christians
