= La Fête du Baiser =

La Fête du Baiser ("festival of the kiss") is a festival celebrated the Saturday after St. Valentine's Day, in Roquemaure, France, near Avignon. Begun in 1989, it commemorates not only Saint Valentine, whom locals claim as a former resident, but the arrival of his remains in 1868 to Roquemaure's collegiate church reliquary. Celebrations revolve around a return to a 19th-century way of life, including costumes and markets.

The relics of St Valentine were purchased in Rome, in hopes of curing the town's diseased vine stocks; within four years they were healed. Today, Roquemaure is home to a winery (Cellar St. Valentine) which produces wines named after the saint.

The festival was started by a local priest, Father René Durieu. Men and women around the village dress as priests and nuns, kissing each other, as well as travelers. Special foods and wines are produced especially for the festival.
