= Saint Valentine's Key =

Metal key charm

- Material: Metal
- Place: Province of Padua, Italy
- Present location: St. George's Oratory, Padua

Saint Valentine's Key is a metal key charm named after Saint Valentine, the patron saint of love and marriage inter alia. The charm is used in the province of Padua, Italy, where it is believed to offer a cure for epilepsy, a condition traditionally known as "Saint Valentine's Malady." In addition to its curative properties, the key is also gifted as a romantic symbol, an invitation to "unlock the giver's heart."

== History ==
The use of Saint Valentine's Key as a charm to ward off epilepsy and other seizure disorders dates back to the Middle Ages. In northern Italy, epilepsy was once commonly referred to as "Saint Valentine's Malady", and Saint Valentine's icon and other holy items were invoked for healing. In Padua, Saint Valentine's Key was particularly popular among those seeking a cure for epilepsy. The key was also common in southern Germany, eastern Switzerland, and Austria, where Saint Valentine was also appealed to for healing.

== In Italy ==
A special ceremony is held on Saint Valentine's Day each year at the St. George's Oratory, Padua. The ceremony involves the gifting of small golden Saint Valentine's Keys to children, which are believed to ward off epilepsy. The tradition has been observed for centuries and is still celebrated today. The keys are a cherished part of Paduan culture and are considered a symbol of love and protection.

=== Symbolism ===
In addition to its healing properties, Saint Valentine's Key is also gifted as a symbol of love and affection. The charm is often given to a romantic partner as an invitation to "unlock the giver's heart." The key is also associated with marriage and is sometimes given as a wedding gift.

== Popular culture ==
Saint Valentine's Key has been featured in popular culture, including in literature and film. In the novel "The Enchanted April" by Elizabeth von Arnim, a character gives a Saint Valentine's Key to her husband as a symbol of her renewed love for him. The charm was also prominently featured in the 2010 film Letters to Juliet, where a character gifts a Saint Valentine's Key to her granddaughter as a symbol of hope and love.
