= Saint Valentine =

3rd-century Roman Christian saint

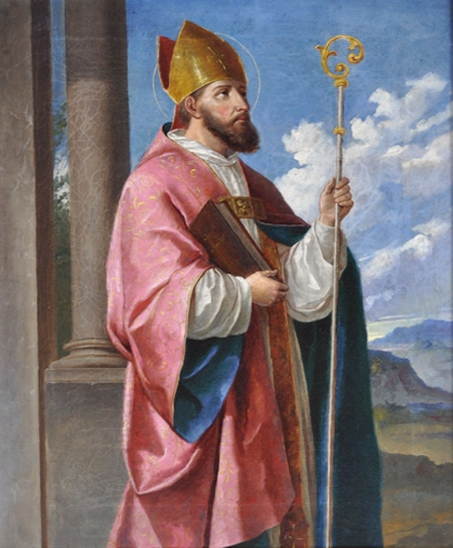
- St. Valentine by Matija Bradaška, c. 1900

Bishop of Terni and Martyr
- Born: c. 199; Terni, Italia, Roman Empire
- Died: c. 270 (aged 42–43); Rome, Italia, Roman Empire
- Venerated in: Catholic Church; Anglican Communion; Eastern Orthodoxy; Lutheranism
- Feast: February 14 (Catholic, Anglican and Lutheran Churches); July 30 and July 6 (Eastern Orthodox)
- Attributes: Birds; roses; bishop with a crippled person or a child with epilepsy at his feet; bishop with a rooster nearby; bishop refusing to adore an idol; bishop being beheaded; priest bearing a sword; priest holding a sun; priest giving sight to a blind girl
- Patronage: Affianced couples, against fainting, beekeepers, happy marriages, love, plague, epilepsy, Lesvos (for Catholics)

Saint Valentine (Italian: Valentino; Latin: Valentinus, c. 199 - c. 270) was a 3rd-century Roman saint, commemorated in Western Christianity on February 14 and in Eastern Orthodoxy on July 6. From the High Middle Ages, his feast day has been associated with a tradition of courtly love. He is also a patron saint of Terni, epilepsy, and beekeepers. Saint Valentine was a clergyman – either a priest or a bishop – in the Roman Empire who ministered to persecuted Christians. He was martyred and his body buried on the Via Flaminia on February 14, which has been observed as the Feast of Saint Valentine (Saint Valentine's Day) since at least the eighth century.

Relics of him were kept in the Church and Catacombs of San Valentino in Rome, which "remained an important pilgrim site throughout the Middle Ages until the relics of St. Valentine were transferred to the church of Santa Prassede during the pontificate of Nicholas IV". His skull, crowned with flowers, is exhibited in the Basilica of Santa Maria in Cosmedin, Rome. Other relics of him are in Whitefriar Street Carmelite Church, Dublin, Ireland, a popular place of pilgrimage, especially on Saint Valentine's Day, for those seeking love. At least two different Saint Valentines are mentioned in the early martyrologies. For Saint Valentine of Rome, along with Saint Valentine of Terni, "abstracts of the acts of the two saints were in nearly every church and monastery of Europe", according to Professor Jack B. Oruch of the University of Kansas.

Saint Valentine is commemorated in the Anglican Communion and the Lutheran churches on February 14. In the Eastern Orthodox Church, he is recognised on July 6; in addition, the Eastern Orthodox Church observes the feast of Hieromartyr Valentine, Bishop of Interamna, on July 30. In 1969, the Catholic Church removed his name from the General Roman Calendar, leaving his liturgical celebration to local calendars, though use of the pre-1970 liturgical calendar is also authorised under the conditions indicated in the motu proprio Summorum Pontificum of 2007. The Catholic Church continues to recognise him as a saint, listing him as such in the February 14 entry in the Roman Martyrology. The official Liturgical Calendar for the Dioceses of the United States identifies February 14 as the memorial of Saints Cyril and Methodius.

== Identification ==
Saint Valentine does not occur in the earliest list of Roman martyrs, the Chronography of 354, although the patron of the Chronography's compilation was a wealthy Roman Christian named Valentinus.

In the Echternach recension of the Martyrologium Hieronymianum, there are mentions of a Valentinus martyred in Rome and a Valentinus martyred in Africa, but without a specific year or further identification. The Martyrologium was likely compiled in the 620s in Luxeuil, with many entries dating from an earlier list of saints from Aquileia.

The Catholic Encyclopedia and other hagiographical sources speak of three Saints Valentine that appear in connection with February 14. One was a Roman priest, another the bishop of Interamna (modern Terni, Italy) both buried along the Via Flaminia outside Rome, at different distances from the city. The third was said to be a saint who suffered on the same day with a number of companions in the Roman province of Africa, of whom nothing else is known. Though the extant accounts of the martyrdoms of the first two listed saints are of a late date and contain legendary elements, "a common nucleus of fact" may underlie the two accounts and they may refer to "a single person".

According to the official biography of the Diocese of Terni, Bishop Valentine was born and lived in Interamna and while on a temporary stay in Rome he was imprisoned, tortured, and martyred there on February 14, 269. His body was hastily buried at a nearby cemetery and a few nights later his disciples retrieved his body and returned him home.

The 2001 and 2004 editions of the Martyrologium Romanum, the Catholic Church's official list of recognised saints, list only one Saint Valentine for February 14: a martyr who died on the Via Flaminia.

The widespread modern legend that the feast of St. Valentine on February 14 was first established in 496 by Pope Gelasius I, who included Valentine among all those "... whose names are justly reverenced among men, but whose acts are known only to God" is in fact based upon a statement in the Gelasian Decree which mentions St George but not St Valentine, and is not in fact by Gelasius.

The name "Valentine", derived from valens (worthy, strong, powerful), was popular in Late Antiquity. About eleven other saints with the name Valentine are commemorated in the Catholic Church. Some Eastern churches of the Western rite may provide still other different lists of Saint Valentines. The Roman martyrology lists only seven who died on days other than February 14: a priest from Viterbo (November 3); Valentine of Passau, papal missionary bishop to Raetia, among first patrons of Passau, and later hermit in Zenoburg, near Mais, South Tyrol, Italy, where he died in 475 (January 7); a 5th-century priest and hermit (July 4); a Spanish hermit who died c. 715 (October 25); Valentine Berrio Ochoa, martyred in 1861 (November 24); and Valentine Jaunzarás Gómez, martyred in 1936 (September 18). It also lists a virgin, Saint Valentina, who was martyred in 308 (July 25) in Caesarea, Palestine.

There is a popular idea that Saint Valentine is a Christianized version of the ancient god Cupid, and the Saint's feast day to be an updated version of Lupercalia, a fertility festival celebrated in February by ancient Romans. The antiquity of this association is not established by evidence. In fact, the "transformation of Valentine into an auxiliary or parallel to Cupid as sponsor of lovers" was a late development, well established by 1400.

== Hagiography and testimony ==
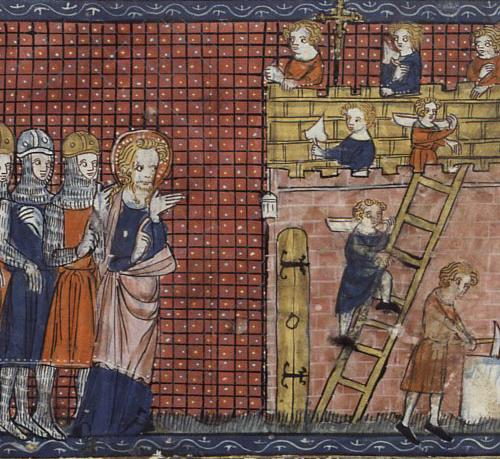
Saint Valentine of Terni oversees the construction of his basilica at Terni, from a 14th-century French manuscript. (BN, Mss fr. 185)

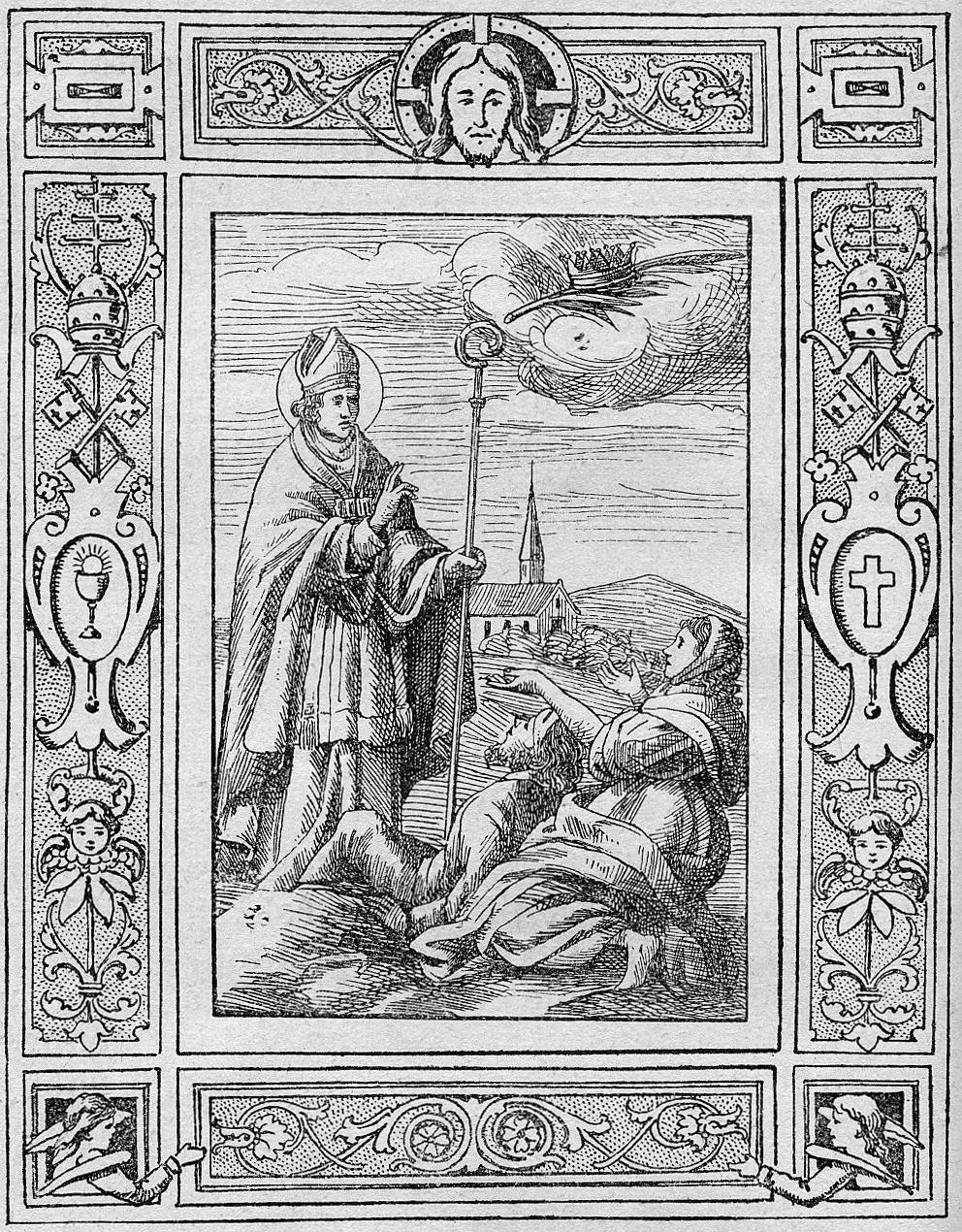
Saint Valentine healing epilepsy, illustrated by Dr. František Ehrmann, c. 1899

The inconsistency in the identification of the saint is replicated in the various vitae that are ascribed to him.

A common hagiography describes Saint Valentine as a priest of Rome or as the former Bishop of Terni, an important town of Umbria, in central Italy. While under house arrest of Judge Asterius, and discussing his faith with him, Valentinus (the Latin version of his name) was discussing the validity of Jesus. The judge put Valentinus to the test and brought to him the judge's adopted blind daughter. If Valentinus succeeded in restoring the girl's sight, Asterius would do whatever he asked. Valentinus, praying to God, laid his hands on her eyes and the child's vision was restored.

Immediately humbled, the judge asked Valentinus what he should do. Valentinus replied that all of the idols around the judge's house should be broken, and that the judge should fast for three days and then undergo the Christian sacrament of baptism. The judge obeyed and, as a result of his fasting and prayer, freed all the Christian inmates under his authority. The judge, his family, and his forty-four member household of adult family members and servants were baptised.

Valentinus was later arrested again for continuing to evangelise. He was sent to the prefect of Rome, to the emperor Claudius Gothicus (Claudius II) himself. Claudius took a liking to him until Valentinus tried to convince Claudius to embrace Christianity. Claudius refused and condemned Valentinus to death, commanding that Valentinus either renounce his faith or he would be beaten with clubs and beheaded. Valentinus refused and was executed outside the Flaminian Gate on February 14, 269.

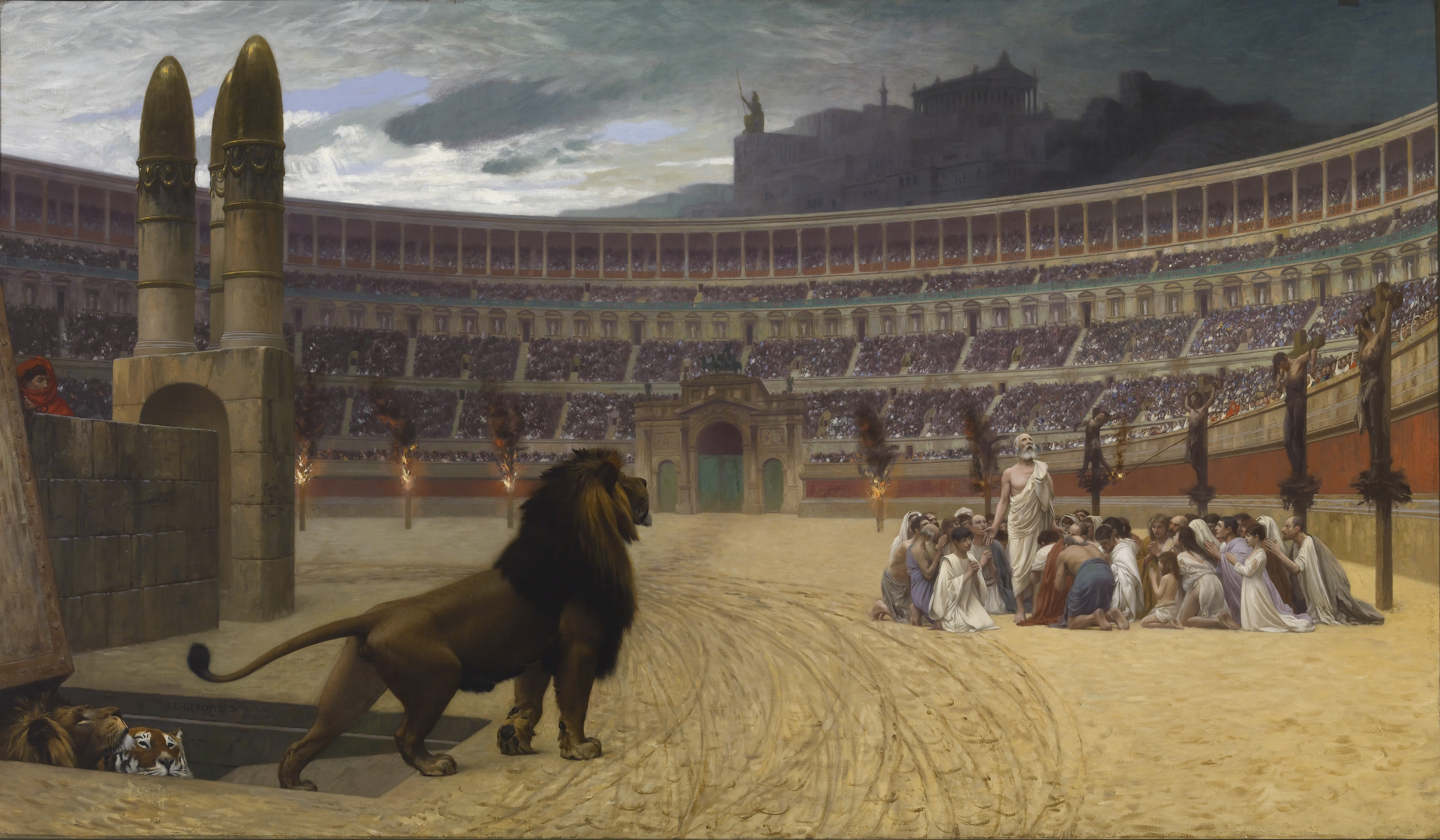
Saint Valentine is said to have ministered to the faithful amidst the persecution of Christians in the Roman Empire.

An embellishment to this account states that before his execution, Saint Valentine wrote a note to Asterius's daughter signed "from your Valentine", which is said to have "inspired today's romantic missives".

The Legenda Aurea of Jacobus de Voragine, compiled c. 1260 and one of the most-read books of the High Middle Ages, gives sufficient details of the saints for each day of the liturgical year to inspire a homily on each occasion. The very brief vita of St Valentine states that he was executed for refusing to deny Christ by the order of the "Emperor Claudius" in the year 269. Before his head was cut off, this Valentine restored sight and hearing to the daughter of his jailer. Jacobus makes a play with the etymology of "Valentine", "as containing valor".

A popularly ascribed hagiographical identity appears in the Nuremberg Chronicle (1493). Alongside a woodcut portrait of Valentine, the text states that he was a Roman priest of exceptional learning who converted the daughter of Asterius and forty-nine others to Christianity before being martyred during the reign of Claudius Gothicus.

There are many other legends behind Saint Valentine. One is that the priest Valentine defied the order of the emperor and secretly performed Christian weddings for couples, allowing the husbands involved to escape conscription into the Roman army. This legend claims that soldiers were sparse at this time so this was a great inconvenience to the emperor. The account mentions that in order "to remind these men of their vows and God’s love, Saint Valentine is said to have cut hearts from parchment", giving them to these persecuted Christians, a possible origin of the widespread use of hearts on St. Valentine's Day.

== Namesake churches ==
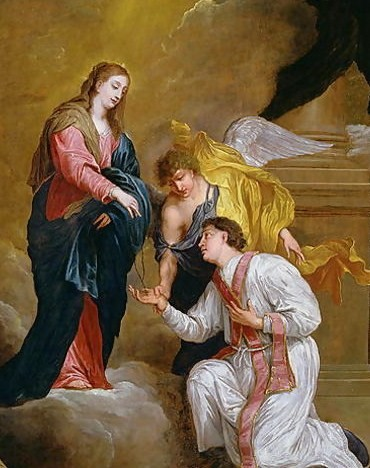
St Valentine Kneeling in Supplication (David Teniers III, 1600s) – Valentine kneels to receive a rosary from the Virgin Mary.

There are many churches dedicated to Saint Valentine in countries such as Italy. Saint Valentine was venerated no more than other Christian martyrs and saints.

A 5th- or 6th-century work called Passio Marii et Marthae made up a legend about Saint Valentine's Basilica being dedicated to Saint Valentine in Rome. A later Passio repeated the legend and added the adornment that Pope Julius I (357–352) had built the ancient basilica S. Valentini extra Portam on top of his sepulchre, in the Via Flaminia. This church was really named after a 4th-century tribune called Valentino, who donated the land on which it is built. It hosted the martyr's relics until the 13th century, when they were transferred to Santa Prassede, and the ancient basilica decayed.

Saint Valentine's Church in Rome, built in 1960 for the needs of the Olympic Village, continues as a modern parish church.

== Saint Valentine's Day ==
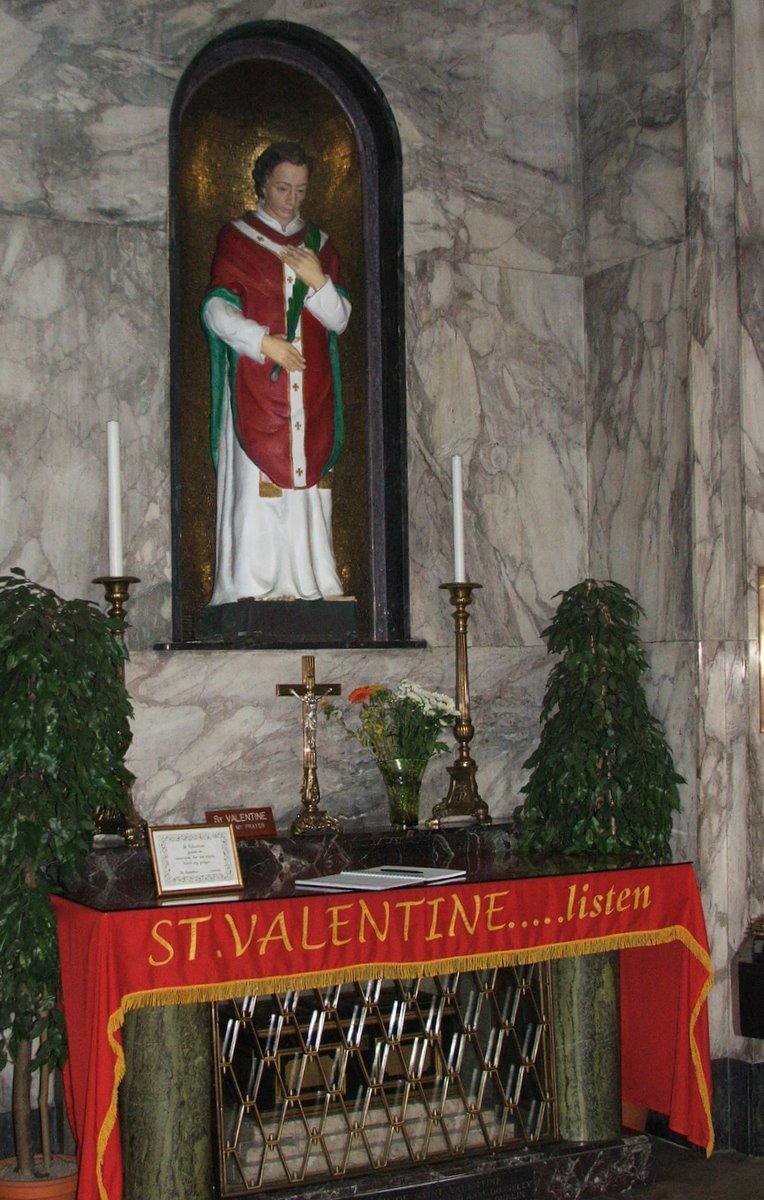
A shrine of Saint Valentine in Whitefriar Street Carmelite Church in Dublin, Ireland

February 14 is Saint Valentine's Day in the Lutheran calendar of saints. Valentine is remembered in the Church of England with a commemoration on February 14. The Church of England had him in its pre-Reformation calendars, and restored his mention as bishop and martyr in its 1661–62 Book of Common Prayer, and most provinces of the Anglican Communion celebrate his feast. The Catholic Church includes him in its official list of saints, the Roman Martyrology.

Saint Valentine was also in the General Roman Calendar for celebration as a simple feast until 1955, when Pope Pius XII reduced all such feasts to just a commemoration within another celebration. The 1969 revision of the General Roman Calendar removed this mention, leaving it for inclusion only in local calendars such as that of Balzan, Malta. His commemoration was still in the 1962 Roman Missal and is thus observed also by those who, in the circumstances indicated in Pope Benedict XVI's 2007 motu proprio Summorum Pontificum, use that edition.

July 6 is the date on which the Eastern Orthodox Church celebrates the Roman presbyter Valentine; on July 30 it observes the feast of the Hieromartyr Valentine, Bishop of Interamna. Members of the Greek Orthodox Church named Valentinos (male) or Valentina (female) may observe their name day on the Western ecclesiastical calendar date of February 14.

English 18th-century antiquarians Alban Butler and Francis Douce, noting the obscurity of Saint Valentine's identity, suggested that Saint Valentine's Day was created as an attempt to supersede the pagan holiday of Lupercalia (mid-February in Rome). This idea has lately been dismissed by academics and researchers, such as Jack B. Oruch of the University of Kansas, Henry Ansgar Kelly of the University of California, Los Angeles and Michael Matthew Kaylor of Masaryk University. Many of the current legends that characterize Saint Valentine were invented in the 14th century in England, notably by Geoffrey Chaucer and his circle, when the feast day of February 14 first became associated with romantic love.

Oruch charges that the traditions associated with "Valentine's Day", documented in Geoffrey Chaucer's Parlement of Foules and set in the fictional context of an old tradition, did not exist before Chaucer. He argues that the speculative explanation of sentimental customs, posing as historical fact, had their origins among 18th-century antiquaries, notably Alban Butler, the author of Butler's Lives of Saints, and have been perpetuated even by respectable modern scholars. In the French 14th-century manuscript illumination from a Vies des Saints (illustration above), Saint Valentine, Bishop of Terni, oversees the construction of his basilica at Terni; there is no suggestion here that the bishop was a patron of lovers.

During the Middle Ages, it was believed that birds paired in mid-February. This was then associated with the romance of Valentine. Although these legends differ, Valentine's Day is widely recognised as a day for romance and devotion. On February 14, 1929, Al Capone's gang "The Outfit" murdered several members of rival Bugs Moran's gang in the "St. Valentine's Day Massacre".

== Associated Christian relics ==
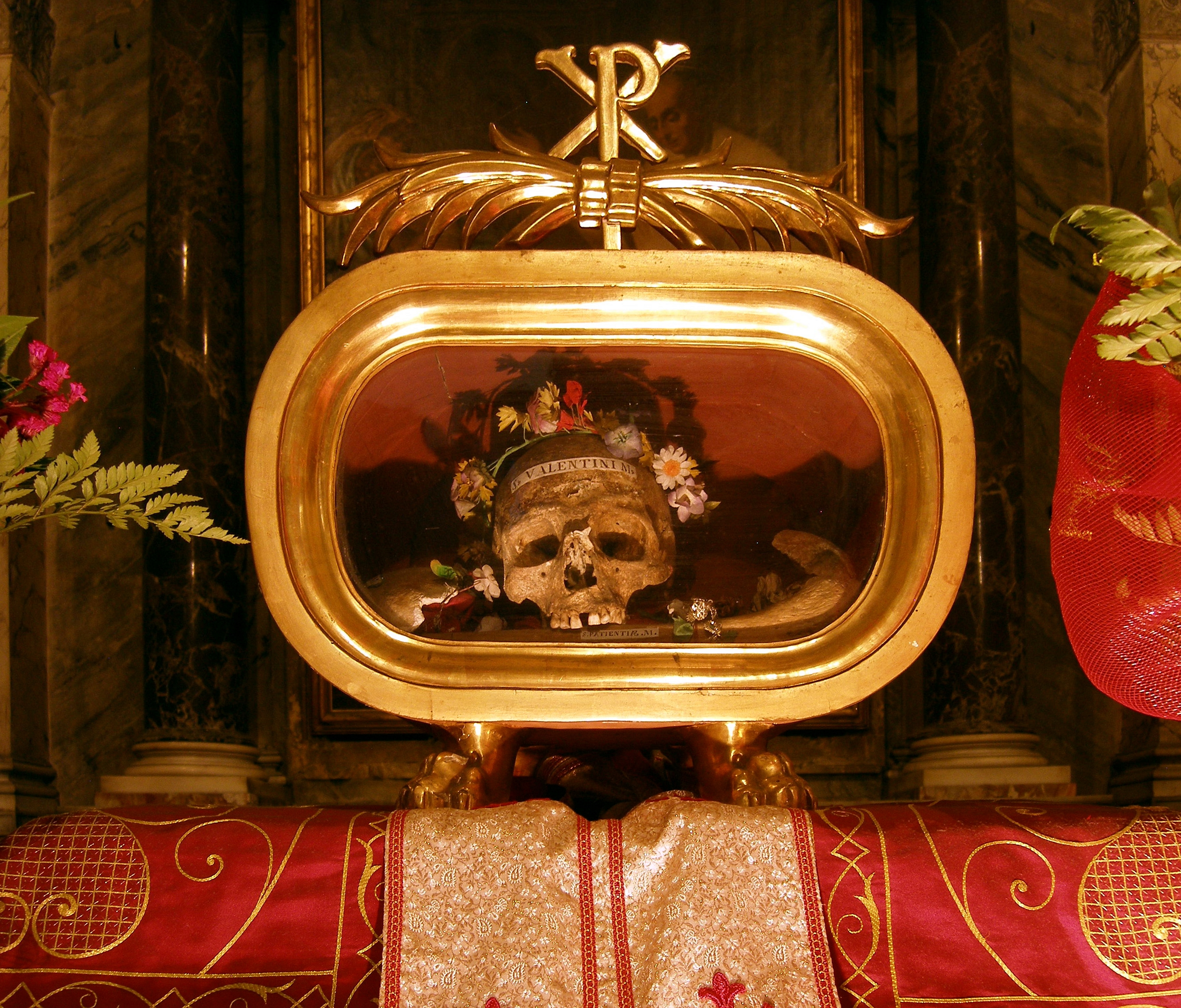
A relic of Saint Valentine in the church of Santa Maria in Cosmedin, Rome

The flower-crowned alleged skull of St. Valentine is exhibited in the Basilica of Santa Maria in Cosmedin, Rome.

St. Valentine's remains are deposited in St Anton's Church, Madrid, where they have lain since the late 1700s. They were a present from the Pope to King Carlos IV, who entrusted them to the Order of Poor Clerics Regular of the Mother of God of the Pious Schools (Piarists). The relics have been displayed publicly since 1984, in a foundation open to the public at all times in order to help people in need.

Whitefriar Street Carmelite Church, Dublin, also houses some relics of St Valentine. On 27 December 1835, the Very Reverend Father John Spratt, Master of Sacred Theology to the Carmelite order in Dublin, was sent the partial remains of St Valentine by Cardinal Carlo Odescalchi, under the auspices of Pope Gregory XVI. The relics and the accompanying letter from Cardinal Odescalchi have remained in the church ever since. The remains, which include "a small vessel tinged with his blood", were sent as a token of esteem following an eloquent sermon Fr Spratt had delivered in Rome.

On Saint Valentine's Day in Ireland, many individuals who seek true love make a Christian pilgrimage to the Shrine of St. Valentine in Whitefriar Street Carmelite Church in Dublin, which is said to house relics of Saint Valentine of Rome; they pray at the shrine in hope of finding romance. Therein lies a book in which foreigners and locals have written their prayer requests for love.

Another relic was found in 2003 in Prague in the Basilica of St. Peter and St. Paul at Vyšehrad.

Saint Valentine's relics can also be found in Slovakia in two cities. The first is Košice, where the relic is placed in the Immaculate Conception (placed in 1720). The second is Nováky, which they had in the church of St. Nicholas and the rare statue of Saint Valentine, which was stolen in the 1990s (according to one saved original part of the statue – the head, a new copy was created, which was ceremoniously placed in the church in 2000.

A silver reliquary containing a fragment of St. Valentine's skull is found in the parish church of St. Mary's Assumption in Chełmno, Poland.

Relics can also be found at the Catholic church of the Metastasis of the Virgin Mary, in Mytilene on the Greek island of Lesbos.

Another set of relics can also be found in Savona, in the Cathedral of Santa Maria Assunta.

Alleged relics of St. Valentine also lie at the reliquary of Roquemaure, Gard, France, in the St. Stephen's Cathedral, Vienna, in Balzan in Malta and also in Blessed John Duns Scotus Church in the Gorbals area of Glasgow, Scotland. There is also a gold reliquary bearing the words "Corpus St. Valentin, M" (Body of St. Valentine, Martyr) at Birmingham Oratory, UK, in one of the side altars in the main church.

== See also ==
- La Fête du Baiser
- Persecution of Christians in the Roman Empire
- Saint Fructus, 8th-century Spanish martyr
- Saint Valentine, patron saint archive
- Saint Valentine's Key

== Bibliography ==
- Johannes Baptista de Rossi et Ludovicus Duchesne, ed., (1894). Martyrologium Hieronymianum: ad fidem codicum adiectis prolegomenis. Ex Actibus Sanctorum Novembris, Tomi II, pars prior. Bruxellis. lxxxii, 195 p. S. Valentinus, p. 20.
- De Voragine, Jacobus. The Life of Saint Valentine. In Legenda Aurea, compiled around 1275
- Delehaye, Hippolyte (1911). "Valentine" . Encyclopædia Britannica. Vol. 27 (11th ed.). pp. 850–851.
- Hülsen, Christian (1927). Le chiese di Roma nel medio evo: cataloghi ed appunti. Florence. CXV, 640 p. (On-line text).
- Thurston, Herbert (1933). St. Valentine, Martyr. In Alban Butler's Lives of the Saints, Vol. II, pp. 214–217. New York. 409 pp.
- Aigrain, René (1953). Hagiographie: Ses sources, ses méthodes, son histoire. Paris.
- Amore, Agostino. S. Valentino di Roma o di Terni?, Antonianum 41 (1966), pp. 260–277.
- Kellogg, Alfred (1972). "Chaucer's St. Valentine: A Conjecture." In Kellogg, Chaucer, Langland, Arthur. 1972, pp. 108–145.
- Amore, Agostino (1975). I martiri di Roma. Roma, Antonianum. 322 p.
- Kelly, Henry Ansgar (1986). Chaucer and the cult of Saint Valentine. Leiden, the Netherlands. 185 p.
- Martyrologium Romanum. Libreria Editrice Vaticana, 2001, p. 141 (February 14). 773 p.
- In Search of St. Valentine. Scotsman.com blog, 14 February 2005.
- Oruch, Jack B. "St. Valentine, Chaucer, and Spring in February", Speculum 56 (July 1981), pp. 534–565.
- Schoepflin, Maurizio and Seren, Linda (2000). San Valentino di Terni : storia, tradizione, devozione. Morena (Roma). 111 p.
- Paglia, Vincenzo. "Saint Valentine's Message". Washington Post, February 15, 2007.
- Saint Valentine: Biography. Diocese of Terni. 2009.
- Thurston, Herbert (2015). St. Valentine. The Catholic Encyclopedia, Vol. 15.
- St Valentine of Terni – English translation of his "Passio" (BHL 8460)
- St Valentine of Rome – English translation of his "Passio" (BHL 8465) – actually an extract from the Acts of Marius, Martha, Audifax and Habbakuk (BHL 5543).
