= Carnosaur (film series) =

Film series produced by Roger Corman

The Carnosaur film series consists of B-movies produced by Roger Corman that feature genetically engineered dinosaurs running amok in various scenarios. The series started with the first Carnosaur film, released in 1993, that was loosely based on the 1984 novel Carnosaur by John Brosnan. Two sequels were released direct-to-video: Carnosaur 2 in 1995, and Carnosaur 3: Primal Species in 1996.

Two subsequent films use footage from the Carnosaur films: Raptor (2001) and The Eden Formula (2006).

== Films ==
Film	U.S. release date	Director(s)	Screenwriter(s)	Producer(s)
Carnosaur	May 13, 1993	Adam Simon	Adam Simon	Mike Elliott and Roger Corman
Carnosaur 2	February 15, 1995	Louis Morneau	Michael Palmer	Mike Elliott and Roger Corman
Carnosaur 3: Primal Species	November 5, 1996	Jonathan Winfrey	Scott Sandin	Roger Corman
Raptor	November 6, 2001	Jim Wynorski	Frances Doel, Michael B. Druxman and Jim Wynorski	Roger Corman
The Eden Formula	September 1, 2006	John Carl Buechler	John Carl Buechler	Peter Davy

=== Carnosaur (1993) ===
Carnosaur was written and directed by Adam Simon, and was released to theaters on May 14, 1993. The film is loosely based on the 1984 novel Carnosaur by John Brosnan. In the film, Dr. Jane Tiptree (Diane Ladd), a mad scientist specializing in agricultural genetic engineering, uses chickens from the plant she works at to breed dinosaurs. She also creates a virus containing dinosaur DNA that will impregnate women with dinosaurs and kill them after birth, so the animals can wreak havoc and exterminate humanity, which she believes needs to be destroyed so that the dinosaurs can rule the planet once again. An alcoholic security guard and an environmental activist attempt to stop her and the dinosaurs, and the military is later sent in to kill the town residents and quarantine the virus. The film was a modest box-office success, reportedly grossing $1,753,979, despite a limited theatrical release.

=== Carnosaur 2 (1995) ===
Directed by Louis Morneau and written by Michael Palmer, Carnosaur 2 was released direct-to-video in February 1995. Starring John Savage and Cliff DeYoung, the film features a group of technicians called in to investigate the power shortage at a top-secret mining facility, only to discover it is actually a remote nuclear dump site where the government transported the dinosaurs from the first film. The dinosaurs have overrun the facility, and now the technicians must try to survive while avoiding a radiation leak and trying to keep the dinosaurs from escaping the facility.

=== Carnosaur 3: Primal Species (1996) ===
Released direct-to-video in November 1996, Carnosaur 3: Primal Species was directed by Jonathan Winfrey and starred Scott Valentine and Janet Gunn. The film involves a group of terrorists who attempt to steal a large shipment of uranium, but instead realize that they have seized a truckload of cloned dinosaurs, which escape. A military team is then sent to contain the creatures.

=== Raptor (2001) ===
Raptor was directed by Jim Wynorski and was released direct-to-video on November 6, 2001. It re-uses dinosaur footage from the three Carnosaur films and cuts them together with new footage shot by Wynorski. The film was created through Roger Corman's company New Concorde, which had worked on the Carnosaur films. The film focuses on a small town sheriff (Eric Roberts) and an animal control officer (Melissa Brasselle) investigating a series of deaths by genetically engineered dinosaurs that escape from a nearby laboratory (mainly Velociraptors), while also dealing with their creator Dr. Hyde (Corbin Bernsen).

=== The Eden Formula (2006) ===
The Eden Formula was written and directed by John Carl Buechler, who worked on the dinosaur effects for the Carnosaur trilogy. The film includes recycled footage from the trilogy combined with new footage. The film was originally released on DVD in Australia, before getting a U.S. DVD release in 2007. Starring Jeff Fahey, Tony Todd and Dee Wallace, the plot revolves around a group of spies who accidentally release a cloned Tyrannosaurus onto the streets of Los Angeles.

== Cast and crew ==
=== Cast ===
Character	Carnosaur Trilogy			Other Films	
Character	Carnosaur	Carnosaur 2	Primal Species Carnosaur 3	Raptor	The Eden Formula
Character	1993	1995	1996	2001	2006
Dr Jane Tiptree	Diane Ladd				
"Doc" Smith	Raphael Sbarge				
Ann Thrush	Jennifer Runyon				
Sheriff Fowler	Harrison Page				
Fallon	Ned Bellamy				
"Slim" Friar	Clint Howard				
Jesse Paloma	Frank Novak				
Dr. Raven	Ed Williams				
Jack Reed		John Savage			
Tom McQuade		Cliff DeYoung			
Ben Kahane		Don Stroud			
"Monk" Brody		Rick Dean			
Jesse Turner		Ryan Thomas Johnson			
Sarah Rawlins		Arabella Holzbog			
Ed Moses		Miguel A. Núñez Jr.			
Joanne Galloway		Neith Hunter			
Joe Walker		Guy Boyd			
Evac Helicopter Pilot		Michael James MacDonald			
Colonel Rance Higgins			Scott Valentine		
Dr Hodges			Janet Gunn		
Polchek			Rick Dean		
Sanders			Rodger Halston		
General Pete Mercer			Anthony Peck		
B.T. Coolidge			Terri J. Vaughn		
Lieutenant Furguson			Billy Burnette		
Proudfoot			Justina Vail		
Dolan			Cyril O'Reilly		
Officer Wilson			Michael James MacDonald		
Sheriff Jim Tanner				Eric Roberts	
Barbara Phillips				Melissa Brasselle	
Dr. Frank Hyde				Corbin Bernsen	
Lola Tanner				Lorissa McComas	
Deputy				Harrison Page	
Lyle Shell				Frank Novak	
Dr. Harrison Parker					Jeff Fahey
Rhonda Shapton					Dee Wallace
James Radcliffe					Tony Todd
Connie					Elina Madison

=== Crew ===
Crew	Film				
Crew	Carnosaur	Carnosaur 2	Primal Species Carnosaur 3	Raptor	The Eden Formula
Crew	1993	1995	1996	2001	2006
Director	Adam Simon	Louis Morneau	Jonathan Winfrey	Jim Wynorski	John Carl Buechler
Producer(s)	Mike Elliott and Roger Corman	Mike Elliott and Roger Corman	Roger Corman	Roger Corman	Peter Davy
Screenwriter(s)	Adam Simon	Michael Palmer	Scott Sandin	Frances Doel, Michael B. Druxman and Jim Wynorski	John Carl Buechler
Composer	Nigel Holton	Ed Tomney	Kevin Kiner	James Horner	Andy Garfield
Cinematographer	Keith Holland	John Aronson	Andrea V. Rossotto	Andrea V. Rossotto	James Legoy
Editor	Richard Gentner	Roderick Davis	Louis Cioffi	Max K. Atkins	Norman Apstein
Production company	New Horizons Picture Corp	New Horizons Picture Corp	New Horizons Picture Corp	New Concorde	Motion Picture Corporation (MPC); Fantastical Cinema LLC; Imageries Entertainment
