= Carnosaur (film) =

1993 film by Adam Simon

- Theatrical release poster
- Directed by: Adam Simon
- Screenplay by: Adam Simon
- Based on: Carnosaur by John Brosnan
- Produced by: Mike Elliott
- Starring: Diane Ladd; Raphael Sbarge; Jennifer Runyon; Harrison Page; Ned Bellamy; Clint Howard
- Cinematography: Keith Holland
- Edited by: Richard Gentner
- Music by: Nigel Holton
- Production company: New Horizon Pictures
- Distributed by: New Horizon Pictures
- Release dates: May 13, 1993 (Ogden); May 14, 1993 (United States)
- Running time: 83 minutes
- Country: United States
- Language: English
- Budget: $850,000
- Box office: $1.8 million

Carnosaur is a 1993 American science fiction horror film written and directed by Adam Simon. The film stars Diane Ladd, Raphael Sbarge, Jennifer Runyon, and Harrison Page. Loosely based on the 1984 John Brosnan novel of the same name, it follows characters Doc Smith and Ann Thrush in their efforts to thwart Dr. Jane Tiptree's plan to exterminate the human race with a lethal virus and replace them with her own genetically created dinosaurs.

Executive producer Roger Corman acquired the rights to Brosnan's novel in 1991 and the project began filming a year later, after Corman learned that another dinosaur film, Jurassic Park, was entering production. Simon reworked most of the plot elements of the novel. Afforded an $850,000 budget, the special effects were completed with models and animatronics largely designed by John Carl Buechler.

Carnosaur was released on May 14, 1993, in Ogden, Utah, and then released regionally in the United States one day later and grossed $1.8 million. The film was panned by critics. Roger Ebert named it the worst movie of 1993, though his colleague Gene Siskel liked the film. The film has since gained a cult following as a "mockbuster". Carnosaur has spawned a film series and was followed by two sequels, Carnosaur 2 (1995) and Carnosaur 3: Primal Species (1996); the series also includes two official spin-offs, Raptor (2001) and The Eden Formula (2006).

== Plot ==
Dr. Jane Tiptree has withdrawn from public life to conduct sequestered research for the Eunice Corporation. DARPA is wary of her work with genetically modified chickens but cannot legally interfere in her research. While in transport, one of Tiptree's chickens hatches a reptilian creature, which kills the driver and escapes. Meanwhile, near her laboratory in the small town of Climax, Nevada, the populace begin suffering from a mysterious illness with flu-like symptoms.

At a nearby quarry, watchman Doc Smith protects excavation equipment from environmentalists. He reports a trespasser, Ann Thrush, but Sheriff Fowler is investigating a series of gruesome killings, perpetrated by Tiptree's missing creature, a Deinonychus. Among the victims is the daughter of Eunice employee Jesse Paloma, but before he raises any suspicion to her research, Tiptree lures him into a laser-protected dinosaur pen where a fully grown Tyrannosaurus rex kills him.

Despite the deaths, Thrush and a group of activists handcuff themselves to excavation equipment in a form of protest. They are attacked by the Deinonychus and everyone except Thrush is slaughtered. Still in shock, Thrush is brought back by Doc to his trailer, where she survives another attack by the creature. Doc discovers a truck with two corpses belonging to Eunice and contacts Tiptree on the vehicle's radio, deducing the creature originated from her facility. As he approaches the lab, Fowler discovers a dinosaur embryo in a carton of eggs and takes it for investigation.

Doc infiltrates Tiptree's laboratory and, at gunpoint, she reveals her experiment subjects to him. The town's mysterious illness is caused by infected chicken eggs, which contain a lethal airborne virus that impregnates women with dinosaur embryos. Her objective is to exterminate the human race and enable dinosaurs to repopulate the Earth. News of the town's deaths reach Eunice sponsors, who trace it to Tiptree. In response, the government places the community under quarantine and resolves to kill all civilians on sight.

With the illness rapidly spreading, Fowler responds to a disturbance at a pet shop. He confronts the Deinonychus, but both he and the dinosaur suffer fatal wounds in the exchange. Top governmental officials, in a secure underground bunker, also begin plotting the repopulation of the human race in response to the virus; they envision a new social order propagated by strict fertilization policies and artificial wombs. At the laboratory, Doc attempts to escape with a cure to the illness and mistakenly enters the dinosaur pen. Tiptree releases the T. rex which pursues Doc out of the facility. Infected herself, Tiptree births a dinosaur and succumbs to the illness.

Doc returns to Thrush, who has been exposed to the illness. The T. rex enters the quarry where Doc uses a skid-steer loader to battle it. He disembowels and kills the T. rex with Thrush's assistance. After injecting her with the serum, Doc is killed by government soldiers alerted to his presence, and both his and Thrush's bodies are burned. The serum is destroyed in the process.

== Cast ==
- Diane Ladd as Dr. Jane Tiptree
- Raphael Sbarge as "Doc" Smith
- Jennifer Runyon as Ann Thrush
- Harrison Page as Sheriff Fowler
- Ned Bellamy as Fallon
- Clint Howard as "Slim" Friar
- Frank Novak as Jesse Paloma
- Ed Williams as Dr. Raven
- Brent Hinkley as Peregrine
- Martha Hackett as Miss Kroghe

== Production ==
John Brosnan's 1984 science fiction novel Carnosaur first came to the attention of Roger Corman during a signing tour for his 1990 autobiography. Brosnan was first approached to write the screenplay in mid-1991 by Corman's wife, Julie, who agreed to meet and they formalized a deal at a bar, written on some napkins. Although Corman secured the rights to produce Carnosaur, the project advanced only when he learned that Jurassic Park was entering production. According to co-producer Mike Elliot, Corman "felt that now was the time to shoot our movie, because he knew he could make the movie faster than anybody else and get it out there first".

Adam Simon, a frequent collaborator with Corman, was tasked with directing Carnosaur and writing its screenplay. The crew was allocated more time to carry out their work than was typical for a Corman production, with Simon having six months for research and writing. On a small budget, his screenplay ignored key plot elements of the novel and reduced the large variety of dinosaur species to two. According to Corman, the main antagonist Dr. Jane Tiptree was originally envisioned for a male actor who had a "great deal of strength and at the same time an intelligent person". With no one available, Corman rewrote the character as a woman and offered it to Diane Ladd, who had previously worked with him on the 1966 film The Wild Angels. TV Guide considered the hiring of Ladd—the mother of Jurassic Park star Laura Dern—a "casting coup". Other cast members included Raphael Sbarge and Jennifer Runyon.

Filming began in late 1992. On an $850,000 budget, principal photography lasted 18 days. Sbarge expressed his enthusiasm to work alongside Ladd, who had an ability to "bring a real sense of believability to the role". He also recalled, with Carnosaur limited by its special effects budget, that the cast's most daunting task was "making all this seem real" for the audience. As production continued through the holiday season, Ladd gifted the services of a Masseuse for the cast and crew for an entire day's worth of production.

Corman later claimed the budget was $4 million but it is likely this was inflated.

=== Special effects ===
Promotional photo of John Carl Buechler with his Deinonychus puppet.

Carnosaur's special effects were largely designed by John Carl Buechler. Because Corman felt that stop-motion techniques and optical effects would interfere with filming, Buechler agreed with him that all the creatures would be "real-time" models. In constructing the dinosaurs, he hired Mike Jones to sculpt the Deinonychus and Jeff Farley to sculpt the Tyrannosaurus rex. The first creature constructed for the film, Farley's three-foot T. rex animatronic puppet, served as the basis for an unused suit model and the full-scale prop. A system of hinges and cables was used to operate the creature and radio-operated eyes.

With seven weeks of pre-production spent sculpting the puppet, the special effects team was left with three weeks to construct a life-size T. rex model. The design of the creature was reminiscent of classic B movie T. rex of the 1950s. The crew cut and pasted sheets of L200, a sturdy, light polyurethane, for its innards, which were then covered with polyurethane foam skin; the final creature was 16 feet (4.9 m) tall, 25 feet (7.6 m) long, and weighted 450 pounds (200 kg).

In Carnosaur's penultimate fight scene, with Doc Smith fighting the creature in a shiploader, the production used both the puppet and life-sized model. Buechler later commented the scene was "nearly shot for shot modeled on the finale of Aliens". Some shots were accomplished with the puppet being filmed in a miniature set which featured scale models of Doc Smith and the shiploader. Buechler and his crew designed the scaled T. rex in order to use forced perspective camera techniques, but only a few forced-perspective shots were actually included in the film.

== Release ==
The Hollywood Reporter stated that the film was originally scheduled to open on June 11, 1993, the same day as Jurassic Park. A week later the same magazine announced that Corman was expected to premiere the film on May 13, at the Wilshire Theater in Ogden, Utah, to coincide with the city's new George S. Eccles Dinosaur Park. The film was shown in Ogden on May 13 and received a regional release on May 14, 1993.

Corman planned to release Carnosaur before Jurassic Park to capitalize on the latter's big-budget marketing campaign. The film opened in 65 theatres four weeks before Jurassic Park but was mainly a home media release. In its limited theatrical run, Carnosaur became a surprise small box office success, earning $1.8 million in U.S. in total. An additional $4.1 million in revenue was generated from home video sales.

The film was first released on VHS in December 1993. It was released on DVD by New Concorde Home Entertainment in April 2000. All three films in the series were released in The Carnosaur Collection in 2001. New Concorde reissued Carnosaur on DVD, along with its sequel in 2003.

== Reception ==
Brosnan credited Carnosaur with raising awareness of his novel but stated that the dinosaurs were "laughable" compared to those in Jurassic Park, and "I will no doubt take the lead in shouting abuse at the screen". Leonard Maltin was critical of what he considered a largely forgettable film, saying its only notoriety will be as "1993's 'other' dinosaur movie". John Petrakis of Chicago Tribune described the film as "convoluted, obtuse and eventually nonsensical" and undermined by its creature models. Variety's Leonard Klady compared Carnosaur to B movie creature films released in the 1950s and surmised it was "destined for a quick trip to the tar pits of video shelves and cable screenings". The Los Angeles Times contributor Kevin Thomas remarked that the film takes itself too seriously and, with consideration to its modest budget, opined that "technically, Carnosaur, looks good, and to its credit, it has a refreshingly cynical finish". In the Deseret News, Chris Hicks wrote that the film could have been "campy and fun" had it not been for its slow pacing and gore. Roger Ebert named it as the worst film he saw in 1993, but Gene Siskel liked the movie and gave it a thumbs-up on their show (ironically, Ebert also liked Siskel's pick for the worst 1993 movie, Cop and a Half).

On Rotten Tomatoes, the film holds an approval rating of 17% based on 12 reviews, with an average rating of 3.4/10. Scott Meslow of The Week called Carnosaur bold for inviting comparisons to Jurassic Park, despite its limitations; he described the film as a "cheaper, stupider, bloodier, crazier" version of Jurassic Park. AllMovie's Brian J. Dillard wrote the effects were poor, but enjoyable, while Daniel Dockery of Syfy felt that Buechler's work and creature designs were underrated. A review in TV Guide described Carnosaur as "a low-budget attempt to cash in on the success of an expensive studio film", but still thought the screenplay was cleverly written.

== Sequels and spin-offs ==
Carnosaur 2 was released in 1995. Buechler returned to work on the film and reused the creature models from the original: "They're the same dinosaurs. They're just shot the way they were designed to be shot", he explained. Carnosaur 2 is considered to be an improvement over the original, both in its cinematography and special effects. A second sequel was released in 1996, Carnosaur 3: Primal Species. Two spin-off films, Raptor and The Eden Formula, were released in 2001 and 2006, respectively.

== See also ==
- List of films featuring dinosaurs
