= Raptor (film) =

2001 American horror film

- Region 2 DVD cover
- Directed by: Jim Wynorski
- Written by: Frances Doel; Michael B. Druxman; Jim Wynorski
- Produced by: Roger Corman
- Starring: Eric Roberts; Melissa Brasselle; Corbin Bernsen
- Cinematography: Andrea V. Rossotto
- Edited by: Max K. Atkins
- Music by: James Horner
- Production company: New Concorde
- Distributed by: New Concorde
- Release date: November 6, 2001
- Running time: 82 minutes
- Country: United States
- Language: English

Raptor is a 2001 American direct-to-video horror film directed by Jim Wynorski, produced by Roger Corman, and starring Eric Roberts, Melissa Brasselle, and Corbin Bernsen. It re-uses dinosaur footage from the Corman-produced Carnosaur film series, edited together with original footage shot by Wynorski. Raptor was produced by Corman's company New Concorde, which had worked on the Carnosaur films.

== Plot ==
When a series of unexplained vicious animal attacks strikes his community, Sheriff Jim Tanner and his assistant Barbara trace them back to a Dr. Hyde, a former military researcher whose government funding for a dinosaur cloning project was cut. When the Pentagon discovers Hyde obtained foreign backing to continue his experiments, they send in a strike team to save Tanner and Barbara and stop Hyde.

== Cast ==
- Eric Roberts as Sheriff Jim Tanner
- Melissa Brasselle as Barbara Phillips
- Corbin Bernsen as Dr. Frank Hyde
- Tim Abell as Captain Connelly
- William Monroe as Captain York
- Lorissa McComas as Lola Tanner, Sheriff Tanner's Daughter
- Frank Novak as Lyle Shell
- Bruce Nozick as FBI Agent
- Harrison Page as Deputy
- Grant Cramer as McCoy, Hyde's Henchman
- Brian Lynn Graham as The Coroner
- GiGi Erneta as Henderson

== Release ==
Raptor was released direct-to-video on November 6, 2001.

== Reception ==
Psychotronic Video wrote that the dinosaur effects "are as painfully awful" as the Carnosaur films. Riley Black, writing for Smithsonian in 2011, criticized the film's recycled footage for its lack of continuity.

== See also ==
- List of films featuring dinosaurs
