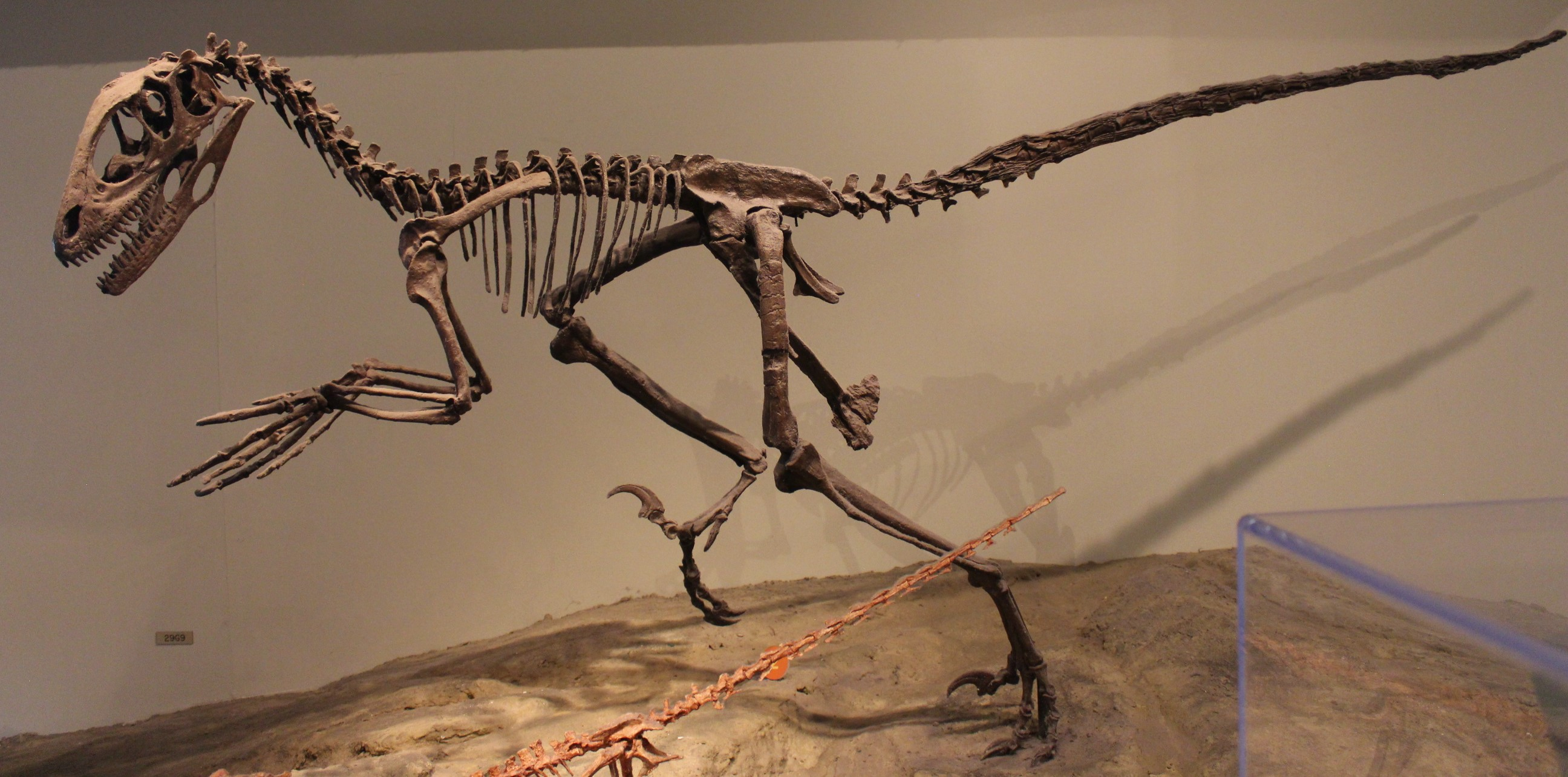
- Mounted skeleton cast, Field Museum

Scientific classification
- Kingdom: Animalia
- Phylum: Chordata
- Class: Reptilia
- Clade: Dinosauria
- Clade: Saurischia
- Clade: Theropoda
- Family: †Dromaeosauridae
- Clade: †Eudromaeosauria
- Genus: †Deinonychus; Ostrom, 1969

Type species
- †Deinonychus antirrhopus Ostrom, 1969

Synonyms
- Velociraptor antirrhopus (Ostrom, 1969) Paul, 1988

= Deinonychus =

Deinonychus Temporal range: Early-Late Cretaceous (Aptian to Cenomanian), 115–98 Ma

Genus of theropod dinosaur

Deinonychus (/daɪˈnɒnɪkəs/ dy-NON-ih-kəs; from Ancient Greek δεινός (deinós) 'terrible' and ὄνυξ (ónux), genitive ὄνυχος (ónukhos) 'claw') is a genus of dromaeosaurid theropod dinosaur with one described species, Deinonychus antirrhopus. This species, which could grow up to 3.4 meters (11 ft) long, lived during the Early and Late Cretaceous Period, about 115–98 million years ago (from the mid-Aptian to Cenomanian stages). Fossils have been recovered from the U.S. states of Montana, Utah, Wyoming, and Oklahoma, in rocks of the Cloverly Formation and Antlers Formation, though teeth that may belong to Deinonychus have been found much farther east in Maryland.

Paleontologist John Ostrom's study of Deinonychus in the late 1960s revolutionized the way scientists thought about dinosaurs, leading to the "dinosaur renaissance" and igniting the debate on whether dinosaurs were warm-blooded or cold-blooded. Before this, the popular conception of dinosaurs had been one of plodding, reptilian giants. Ostrom noted the small body, sleek, horizontal posture, ratite-like spine, and especially the enlarged raptorial claws on the feet, which suggested an active, agile predator.

"Terrible claw" refers to the unusually large, sickle-shaped talon on the second toe of each hind foot. The fossil YPM 5205 preserves a large, strongly curved ungual. In life, archosaurs have a horny sheath over this bone, which extends the length. Ostrom looked at crocodile and bird claws and reconstructed the claw for YPM 5205 as over 120 millimetres (4.7 in) long. The species name antirrhopus means "counter balance", which refers to Ostrom's idea about the function of the tail. As in other dromaeosaurids, the tail vertebrae have a series of ossified tendons and super-elongated bone processes. These features seemed to make the tail into a stiff counterbalance, but a fossil of the very closely related Velociraptor mongoliensis (IGM 100/986) has an articulated tail skeleton that is curved laterally in a long S-shape. This suggests that, in life, the tail could bend to the sides with a high degree of flexibility. In both the Cloverly and Antlers formations, Deinonychus remains have been found closely associated with those of the ornithopod Tenontosaurus. Teeth discovered associated with Tenontosaurus specimens imply they were hunted, or at least scavenged upon, by Deinonychus. This has led to a debate on whether or not Deinonychus was gregarious or solitary, with recent evidence suggesting it may have been gregarious, despite not living in mammal-like packs.

== Discovery and naming ==
Fossilized remains of Deinonychus have been recovered from the Cloverly Formation of Montana and Wyoming and in the roughly contemporary Antlers Formation of Oklahoma, in North America. The Cloverly formation has been dated to the late Aptian through early Albian stages of the early Cretaceous, about 115 to 93 Ma. Additionally, teeth found in the Arundel Clay Facies (mid-Aptian), of the Potomac Formation on the Atlantic Coastal Plain of Maryland may be assigned to the genus.

The first remains were uncovered in 1931 in southern Montana near the town of Billings. The team leader, paleontologist Barnum Brown, was primarily concerned with excavating and preparing the remains of the ornithopod dinosaur Tenontosaurus, but in his field report from the dig site to the American Museum of Natural History, he reported the discovery of a small carnivorous dinosaur close to a Tenontosaurus skeleton, "but encased in lime difficult to prepare." He informally called the animal "Daptosaurus agilis" and made preparations for describing it and having the skeleton, specimen AMNH 3015, put on display, but never finished this work. Brown brought back from the Cloverly Formation the skeleton of a smaller theropod with seemingly oversized teeth that he informally named "Megadontosaurus". John Ostrom, reviewing this material decades later, realized that the teeth came from Deinonychus, but the skeleton came from a completely different animal. He named this skeleton Microvenator.

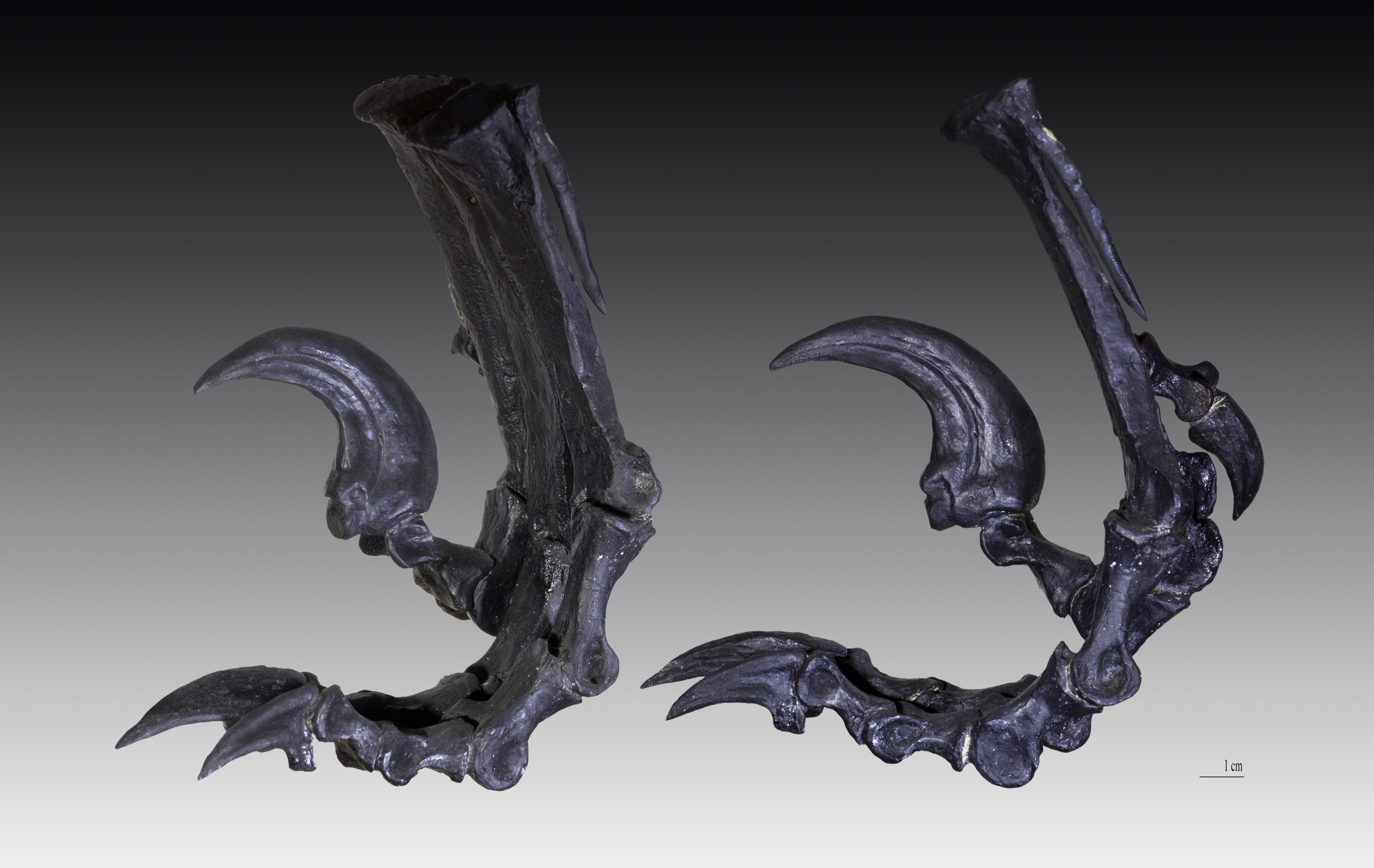
Cast of the holotype foot YPM 5205 from two angles

A little more than thirty years later, in August 1964, paleontologist John Ostrom led an expedition from Yale's Peabody Museum of Natural History which discovered more skeletal material near Bridger. Expeditions during the following two summers uncovered more than 1,000 bones, representing at least three individuals. Since the association between the various recovered bones was weak, making the exact number of individual animals represented impossible to determine properly, the type specimen (YPM 5205) of Deinonychus was restricted to the complete left foot and partial right foot that definitely belonged to the same individual. The remaining specimens were catalogued in fifty separate entries at Yale's Peabody Museum although they could have been from as few as three individuals.

Later study by Ostrom and Grant E. Meyer analyzed their own material as well as Brown's "Daptosaurus" in detail and found them to be the same species. Ostrom first wrote the manuscript by December 1968 and officially published his findings in February 1969, giving all the referred remains the new name of Deinonychus antirrhopus. The specific name "antirrhopus", from Greek ἀντίρροπος, means "counterbalancing" and refers to the likely purpose of a stiffened tail. In July 1969, Ostrom published a very extensive monograph on Deinonychus.

Though a myriad of bones was available by 1969, many important ones were missing or hard to interpret. There were few postorbital skull elements, no femurs, no sacrum, no furcula or sternum, missing vertebrae, and (Ostrom thought) only a tiny fragment of a coracoid. Ostrom's skeletal reconstruction of Deinonychus included a very unusual pelvic bone—a pubis that was trapezoidal and flat, unlike that of other theropods, but which was the same length as the ischium and which was found right next to it.

=== Further findings ===
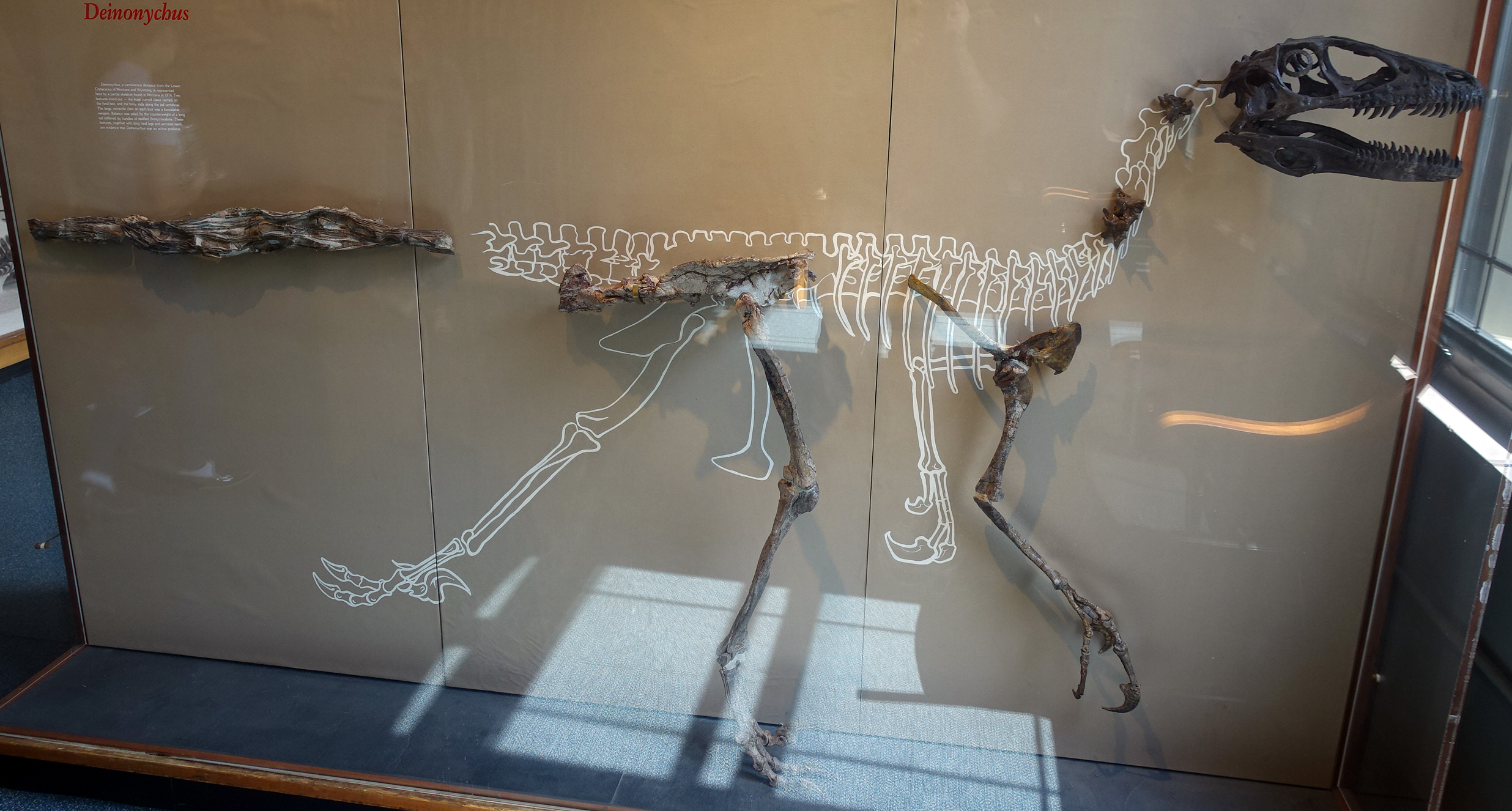
Specimen MCZ 4371 with skull cast at Harvard Museum of Natural History, Harvard University

In 1974, Ostrom published another monograph on the shoulder of Deinonychus in which he realized that the pubis that he had described was actually a coracoid—a shoulder element. In that same year, another specimen of Deinonychus, MCZ 4371, was discovered and excavated in Montana by Steven Orzack during a Harvard University expedition headed by Farish Jenkins. This discovery added several new elements: well preserved femora, pubes, a sacrum, and better ilia, as well as elements of the pes and metatarsus. Ostrom described this specimen and revised his skeletal restoration of Deinonychus. This time it showed the very long pubis, and Ostrom began to suspect that they may have even been a little retroverted like those of birds.

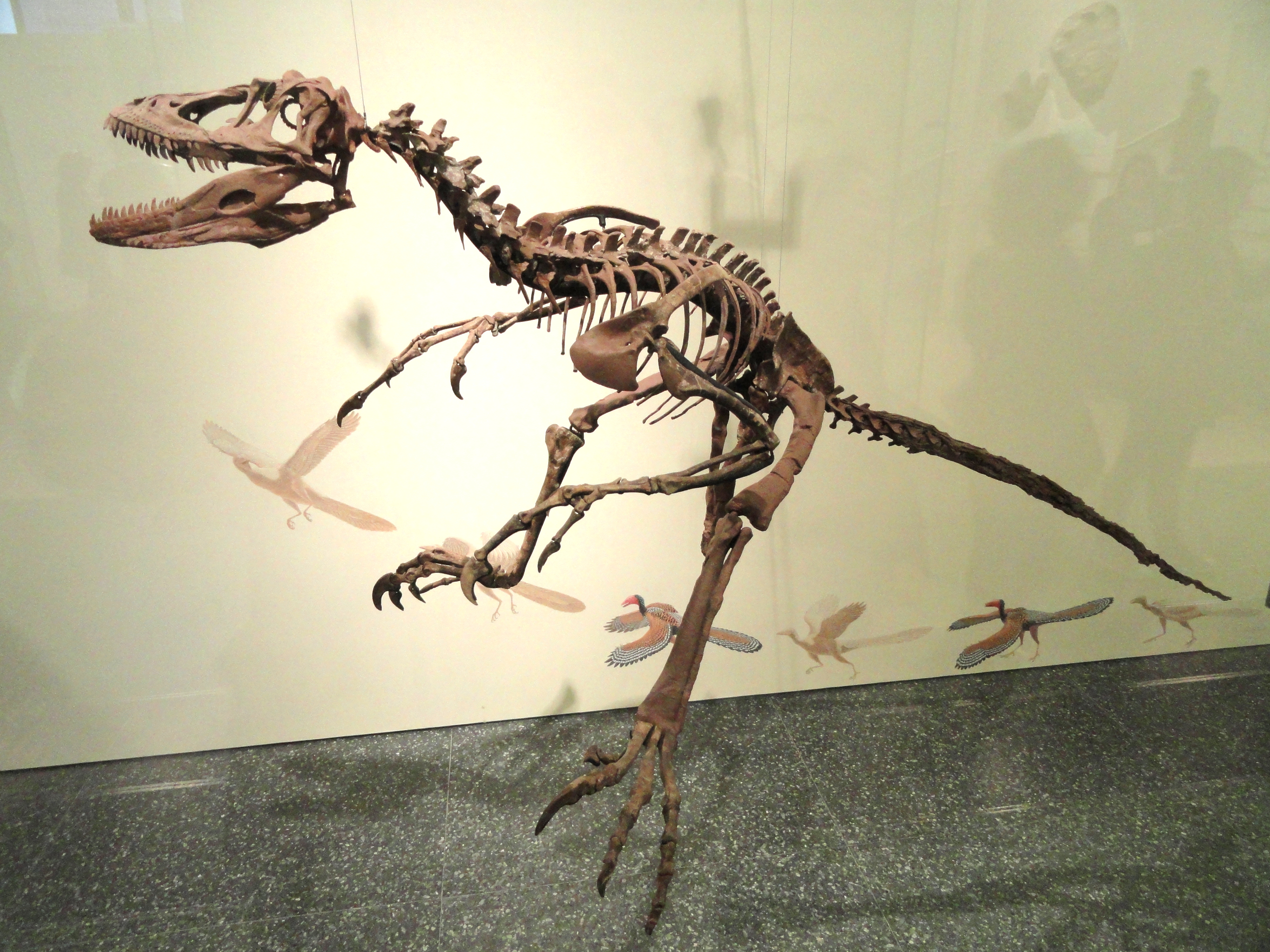
Reconstructed skeleton of specimen AMNH 3015, with outdated hand posture

The similarity of the forelimbs (left) with those of Archaeopteryx (right) led John Ostrom to revive the link between dinosaurs and birds

A skeleton of Deinonychus, including bones from the original (and most complete) AMNH 3015 specimen, can be seen on display at the American Museum of Natural History, with another specimen (MCZ 4371) on display at the Museum of Comparative Zoology at Harvard University. The American Museum and Harvard specimens are from a different locality than the Yale specimens. Even these two skeletal mounts are lacking elements, including the sterna, sternal ribs, furcula, and gastralia.

Even after all Ostrom's work, several small blocks of lime-encased material remained unprepared in storage at the American Museum. These consisted mostly of isolated bones and bone fragments, including the original matrix, or surrounding rock in which the specimens were initially buried. An examination of these unprepared blocks by Gerald Grellet-Tinner and Peter Makovicky in 2000 revealed an interesting, overlooked feature. Several long, thin bones identified on the blocks as ossified tendons (structures that helped stiffen the tail of Deinonychus) turned out to actually represent gastralia (abdominal ribs). More significantly, a large number of previously unnoticed fossilized eggshells were discovered in the rock matrix that had surrounded the original Deinonychus specimen.

In a subsequent, more detailed report, on the eggshells, Grellet-Tinner and Makovicky concluded that the egg almost certainly belonged to Deinonychus, representing the first dromaeosaurid egg to be identified. Moreover, the external surface of one eggshell was found in close contact with the gastralia suggesting that Deinonychus might have brooded its eggs. This implies that Deinonychus used body heat transfer as a mechanism for egg incubation, and indicates an endothermy similar to modern birds. Further study by Gregory Erickson and colleagues finds that this individual was 13 or 14 years old at death and its growth had plateaued. Unlike other theropods in their study of specimens found associated with eggs or nests, it had finished growing at the time of its death.

=== Implications ===
Ostrom's description of Deinonychus in 1969 has been described as the most important single discovery of dinosaur paleontology in the mid-20th century. The discovery of this clearly active, agile predator did much to change the scientific (and popular) conception of dinosaurs and opened the door to speculation that some dinosaurs may have been warm-blooded. This development has been termed the dinosaur renaissance. Several years later, Ostrom noted similarities between the forefeet of Deinonychus and that of birds, an observation which led him to revive the hypothesis that birds are descended from dinosaurs. Forty years later, this idea is almost universally accepted.

Because of its extremely bird-like anatomy and close relationship to other dromaeosaurids, paleontologists hypothesize that Deinonychus was probably covered in feathers. Clear fossil evidence of modern avian-style feathers exists for several related dromaeosaurids, including Velociraptor and Microraptor, though no direct evidence is yet known for Deinonychus itself. When conducting studies of such areas as the range of motion in the forelimbs, paleontologists like Phil Senter have taken the likely presence of wing feathers (as present in all known dromaeosaurs with skin impressions) into consideration.

== Description ==
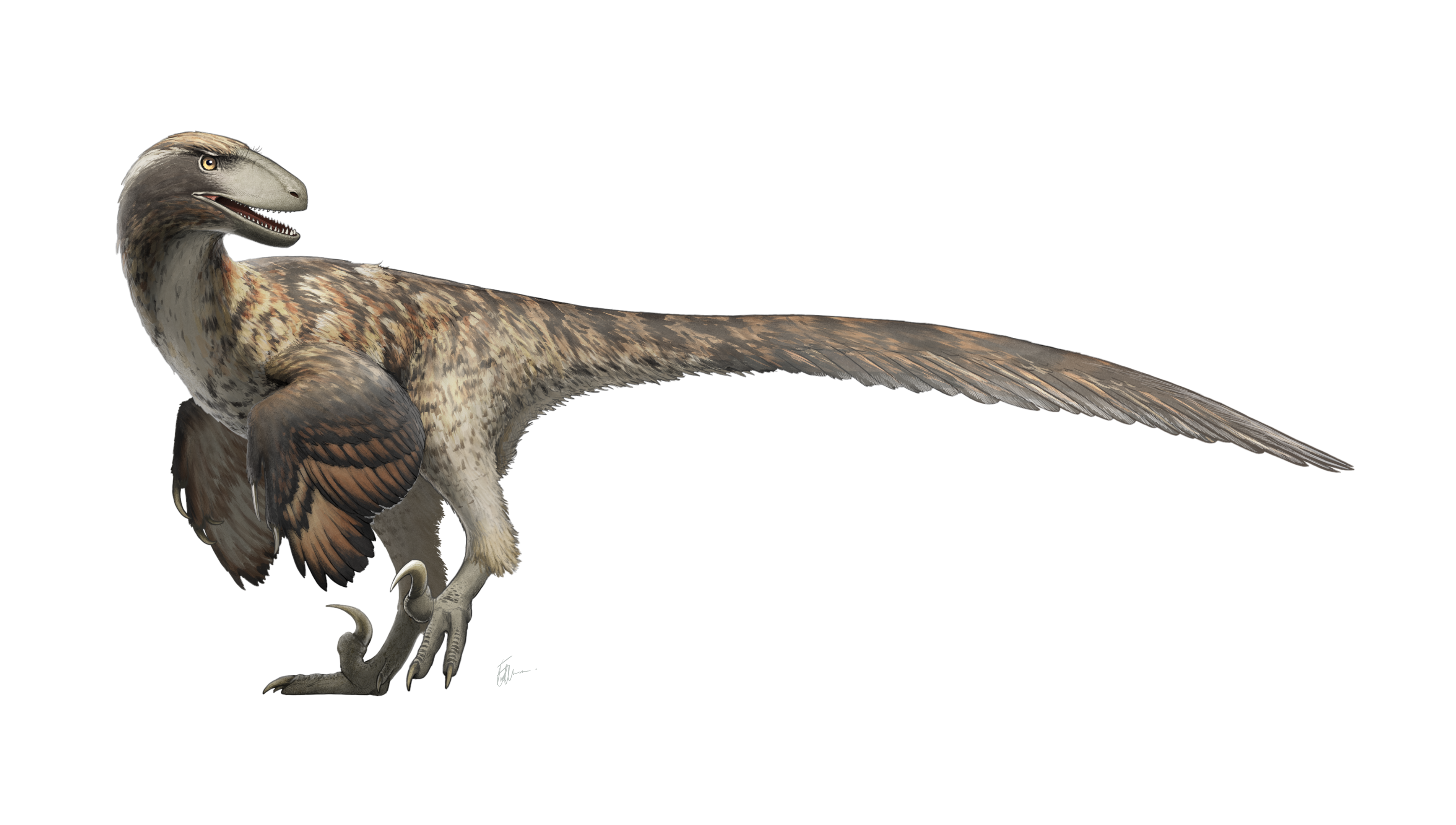
Life restoration

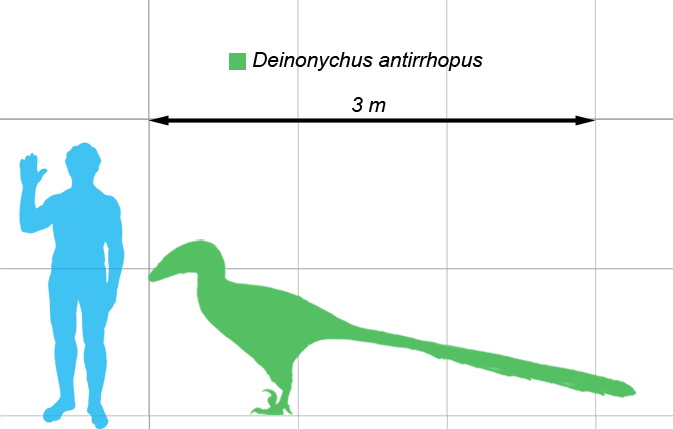
Size compared with a human

Based on the few fully mature specimens, Paul estimated that Deinonychus could reach 3.3–3.4 meters (10 ft 10 in – 11 ft 2 in) in length, with a skull length of 410 millimeters (16 in), a hip height of 0.87 meters (2.9 ft) and a body mass of 60–73 kg (132–161 lb). Campione and his colleagues proposed a higher mass estimate of 100 kg (220 lb) based on femur and humerus circumference.

The skull was equipped with powerful jaws lined with around seventy curved, blade-like teeth. Studies of the skull have progressed a great deal over the decades. Ostrom reconstructed the partial, imperfectly preserved skulls that he had as triangular, broad, and fairly similar to Allosaurus. Additional Deinonychus skull material and closely related species found with good three-dimensional preservation show that the palate was more vaulted than Ostrom thought, making the snout far narrower, while the jugals flared broadly, giving greater stereoscopic vision. The skull of Deinonychus was different from that of Velociraptor, however, in that it had a more robust skull roof, like that of Dromaeosaurus, and did not have the depressed nasals of Velociraptor. Both the skull and the lower jaw had fenestrae (skull openings) which reduced the weight of the skull. In Deinonychus, the antorbital fenestra, a skull opening between the eye and nostril, was particularly large.

Deinonychus possessed large "hands" (manus) with three claws on each forelimb. The first digit was shortest and the second was longest. Each hind foot bore a sickle-shaped claw on the second digit, which was probably used during predation.

No skin impressions have ever been found in association with fossils of Deinonychus. Nonetheless, the evidence suggests that the Dromaeosauridae, including Deinonychus, had feathers. The genus Microraptor is both older geologically and more primitive phylogenetically than Deinonychus, and within the same family. Multiple fossils of Microraptor preserve pennaceous, vaned feathers like those of modern birds on the arms, legs, and tail, along with covert and contour feathers. Velociraptor is geologically younger than Deinonychus, but even more closely related. A specimen of Velociraptor has been found with quill knobs on the ulna. Quill knobs are where the follicular ligaments attached, and are a direct indicator of feathers of modern aspect.

== Classification ==
Deinonychus antirrhopus is one of the best known dromaeosaurid species, and also a close relative of the smaller Velociraptor, which is found in younger, Late Cretaceous-age rock formations in Central Asia. The clade they form is called Velociraptorinae. The subfamily name Velociraptorinae was first coined by Rinchen Barsbold in 1983 and originally contained the single genus Velociraptor. Later, Phil Currie included most of the dromaeosaurids. Two Late Cretaceous genera, Tsaagan from Mongolia and the North American Saurornitholestes, may also be close relatives, but the latter is poorly known and hard to classify. Velociraptor and its allies are regarded as using their claws more than their skulls as killing tools, as opposed to dromaeosaurines like Dromaeosaurus, which have stockier skulls. Phylogenetically, the dromaeosaurids represent one of the non-avialan dinosaur groups most closely related to birds. The cladogram below follows a 2015 analysis by paleontologists Robert DePalma, David Burnham, Larry Martin, Peter Larson, and Robert Bakker, using updated data from the Theropod Working Group. This study currently classifies Deinonychus as a member of the Dromaeosaurinae.

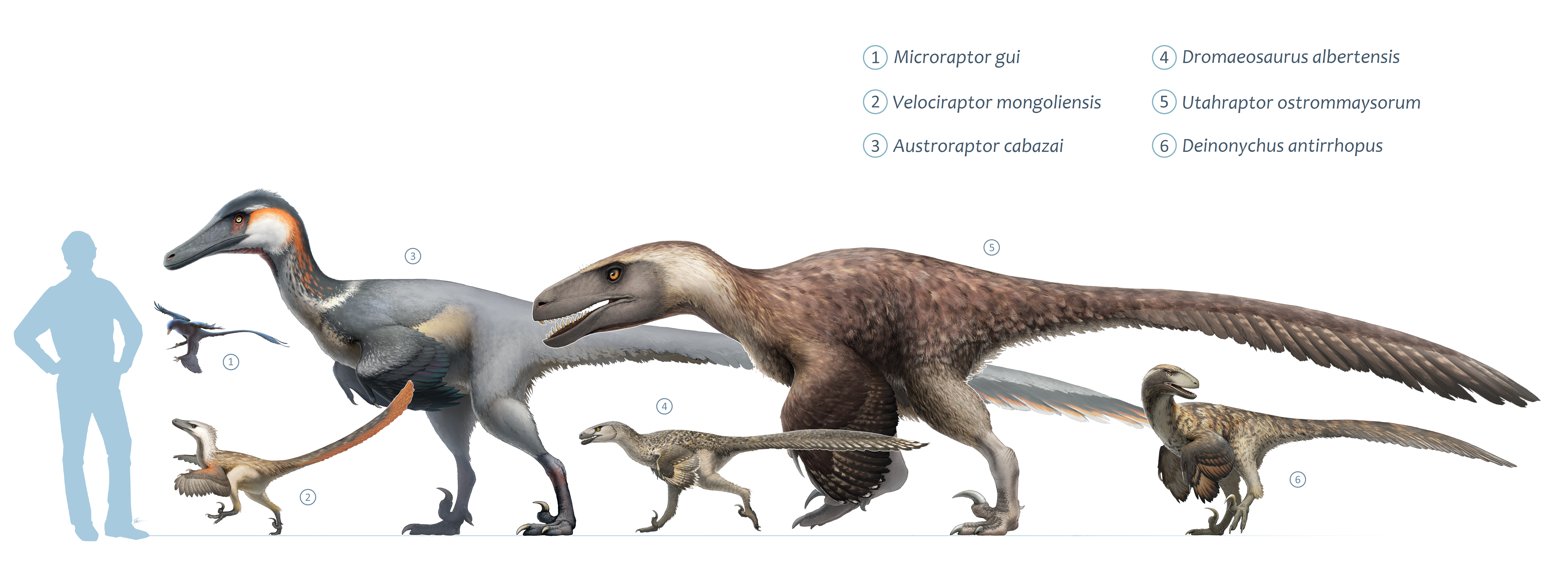
Size of Deinonychus (6) compared with other dromaeosaurids

- Dromaeosauridae
  - Unenlagiinae
  - - Microraptoria
    - - Bambiraptor
      - - Tianyuraptor
        - - Adasaurus
          - - Tsaagan
            - Eudromaeosauria
              - Saurornitholestes
              - - Velociraptor
                - Dromaeosaurinae
                  - Deinonychus
                  - - Atrociraptor
                    - - Achillobator
                      - - Utahraptor
                        - - Dakotaraptor
                          - Dromaeosaurus

A 2021 study of the dromaeosaurid Kansaignathus recovered Deinonychus as a velociraptorine rather than a dromaeosaurine, with Kansaignathus being an intermediate basal form more advanced than Deinonychus but more primitive than Velociraptor. The cladogram below showcases these newly described relationships:

- Dromaeosauridae
  - Mahakala
  - Halszkaraptorinae
    - Halszkaraptor
    - Hulsanpes
  - - Microraptorinae
    - - Unenlagiinae
      - - Bambiraptor
        - - Dakotaraptor
          - Eudromaeosauria
            - Saurornitholestinae
            - - Dromaeosaurinae
              - Velociraptorinae
                - Deinonychus
                - - Kansaignathus
                  - - Acheroraptor
                    - - Adasaurus
                      - Velociraptor
                      - - Velociraptor osmolskae
                        - - Dineobellator
                          - - Linheraptor
                            - Tsaagan

A study in 2022, however, reclassified Deinonychus as a basal member of Dromaeosaurinae again.

== Paleobiology ==
=== Predatory behavior ===
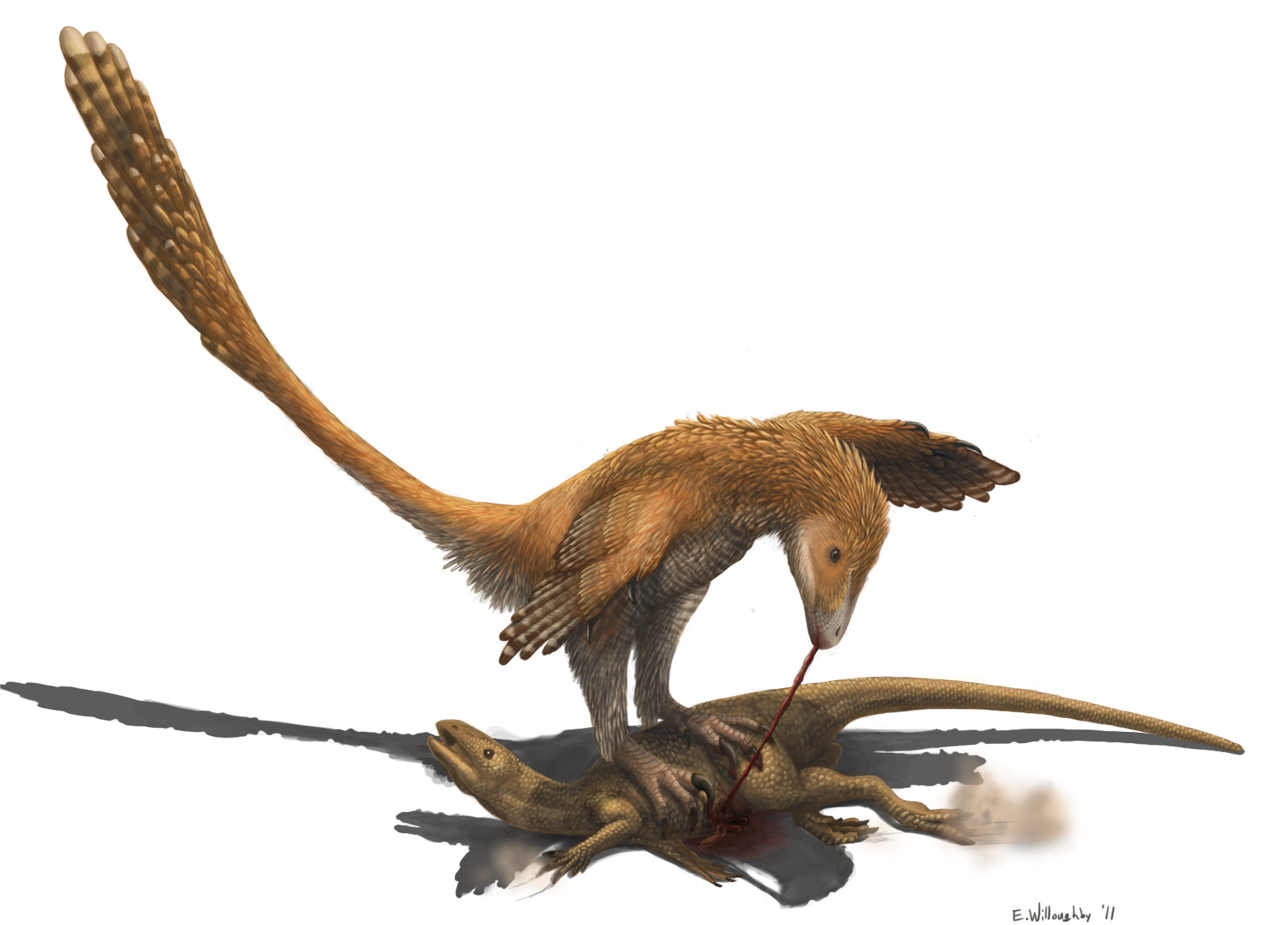
Interpretation of a Deinonychus preying on a Zephyrosaurus in manner suggested by Fowler et al. (2011)

In 2009, Manning and colleagues interpreted dromaeosaur claw tips as functioning as a puncture and gripping element, whereas the expanded rear portion of the claw transferred load stress through the structure. They argue that the anatomy, form, and function of the foot's recurved digit II and hand claws of dromaeosaurs support a prey capture/grappling/climbing function. The team also suggest that a ratchet-like locking ligament might have provided an energy-efficient way for dromaeosaurs to hook their recurved digit II claw into prey. Shifting body weight locked the claws passively, allowing their jaws to dispatch prey. They conclude that the enhanced climbing abilities of dromaeosaur dinosaurs supported a scansorial (climbing) phase in the evolution of flight.

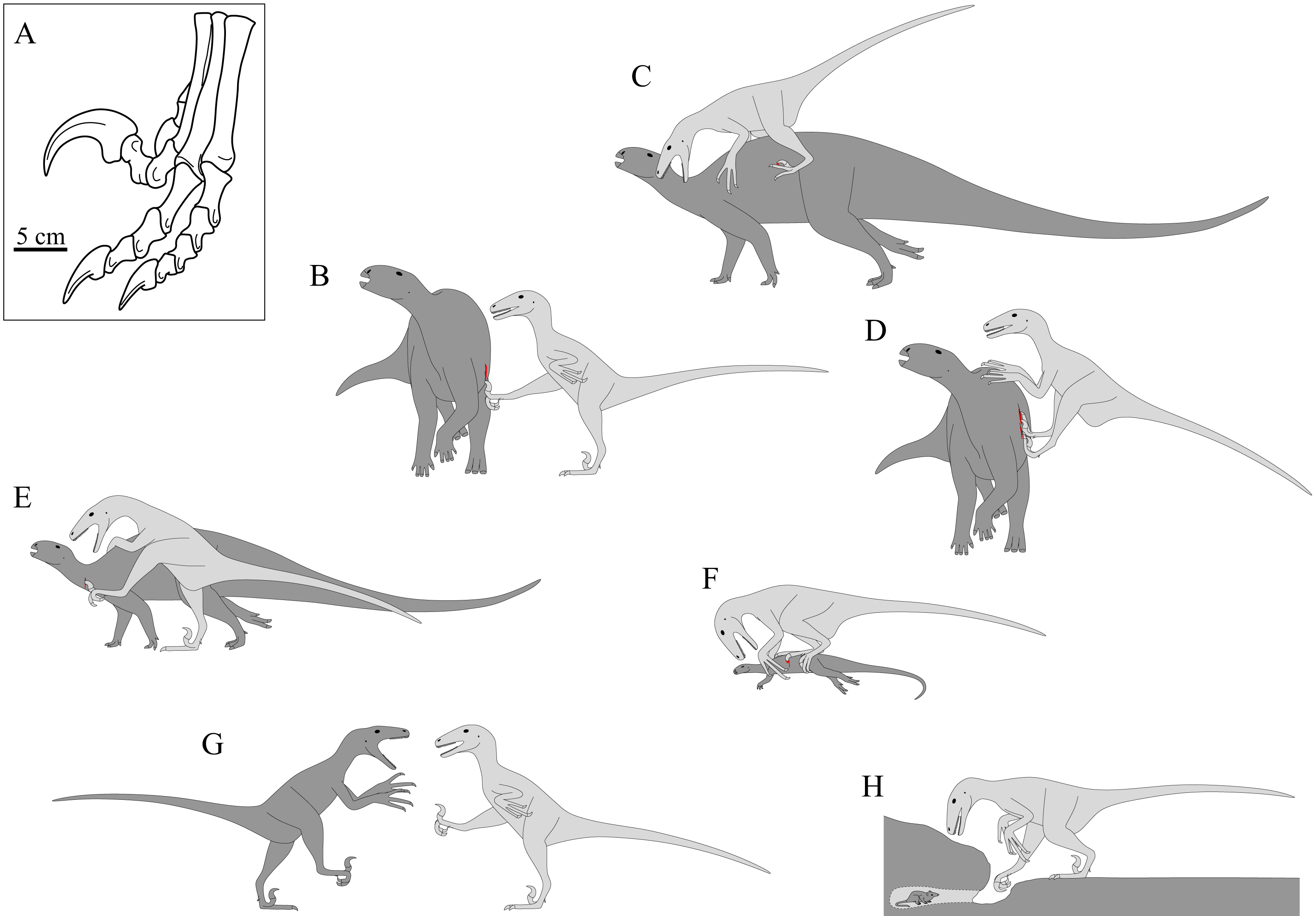
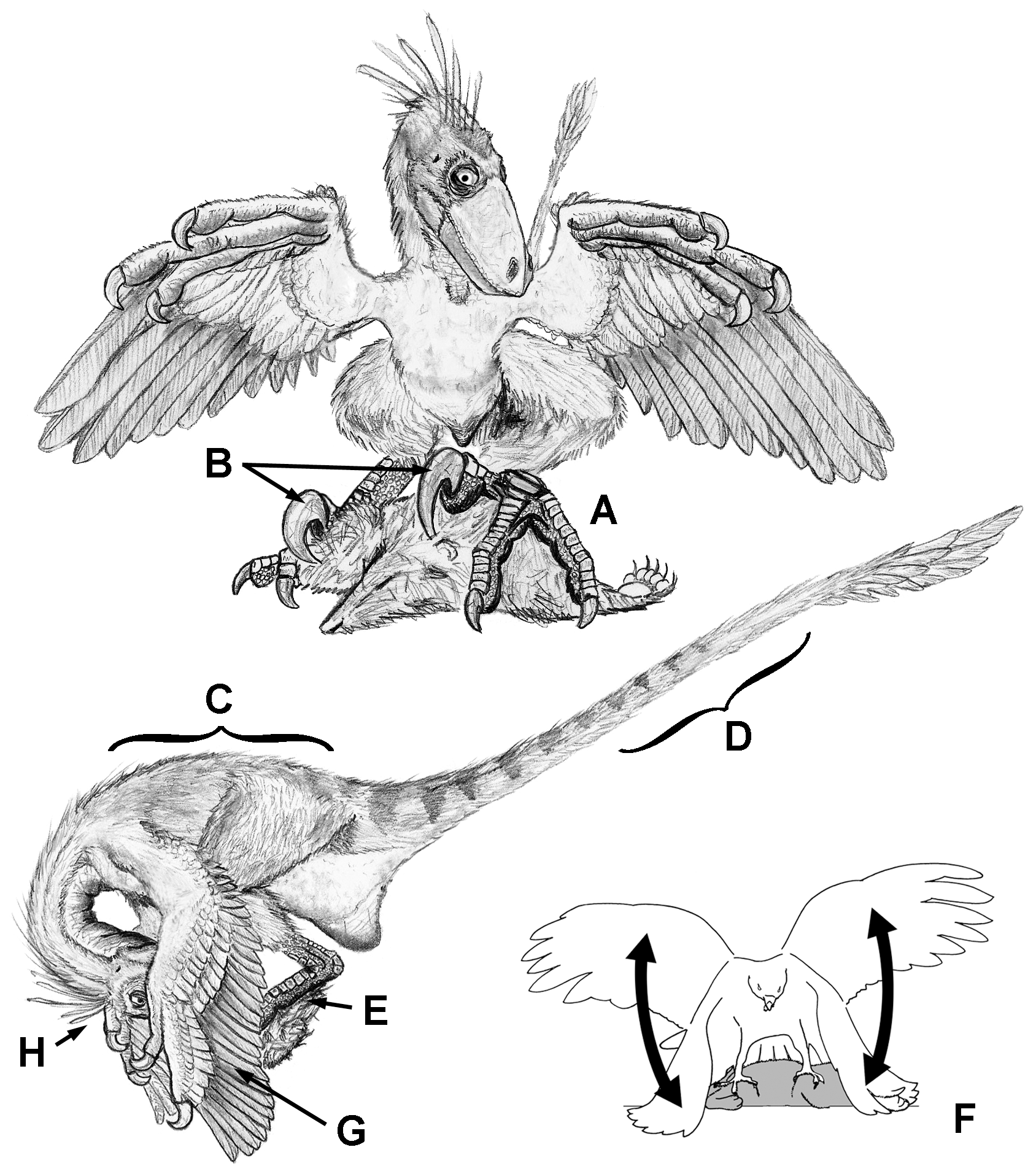
Illustrations of various hypotheses for how dromaeosaurids used their sickle-claws (left, feathers omitted for clarity), and of the "Raptor Prey Restraint" model, a hypothesis supported by 21st century studies (right)

In 2011, Denver Fowler and colleagues suggested a new method by which Deinonychus and other dromaeosaurs may have captured and restrained prey. This model, known as the "raptor prey restraint" (RPR) model of predation, proposes that Deinonychus killed its prey in a manner very similar to extant accipitrid birds of prey: by leaping onto its quarry, pinning it under its body weight, and gripping it tightly with the large, sickle-shaped claws. Like accipitrids, the dromaeosaur would then begin to feed on the animal while still alive, until it eventually died from blood loss and organ failure. This proposal is based primarily on comparisons between the morphology and proportions of the feet and legs of dromaeosaurs to several groups of extant birds of prey with known predatory behaviors. Fowler found that the feet and legs of dromaeosaurs most closely resemble those of eagles and hawks, especially in terms of having an enlarged second claw and a similar range of grasping motion. However, the short metatarsus and foot strength would have been more similar to that of owls. The RPR method of predation would be consistent with other aspects of Deinonychus's anatomy, such as their unusual jaw and arm morphology. The arms were likely covered in long feathers, and may have been used as flapping stabilizers for balance while atop struggling prey, along with the stiff counterbalancing tail. Its jaws, thought to have had a comparatively weak bite force, might be used for saw motion bites, like the modern Komodo dragon which also has a weak bite force, to finish off its prey if its kicks were not powerful enough. In 2020, Powers and colleagues analyzed the snout morphology of dromaeosaurids from North America and Asia, their findings suggest that the maxilla of Deinonychus was short and deep, resembling that of short-snouted canids, suggesting that Deinonychus specialized on larger prey. Within the same year, isotopic analysis done by Frederickson and colleagues, found that adult Deinonychus were likely feeding on Tenontosaurus to some degree.

==== Bite force ====
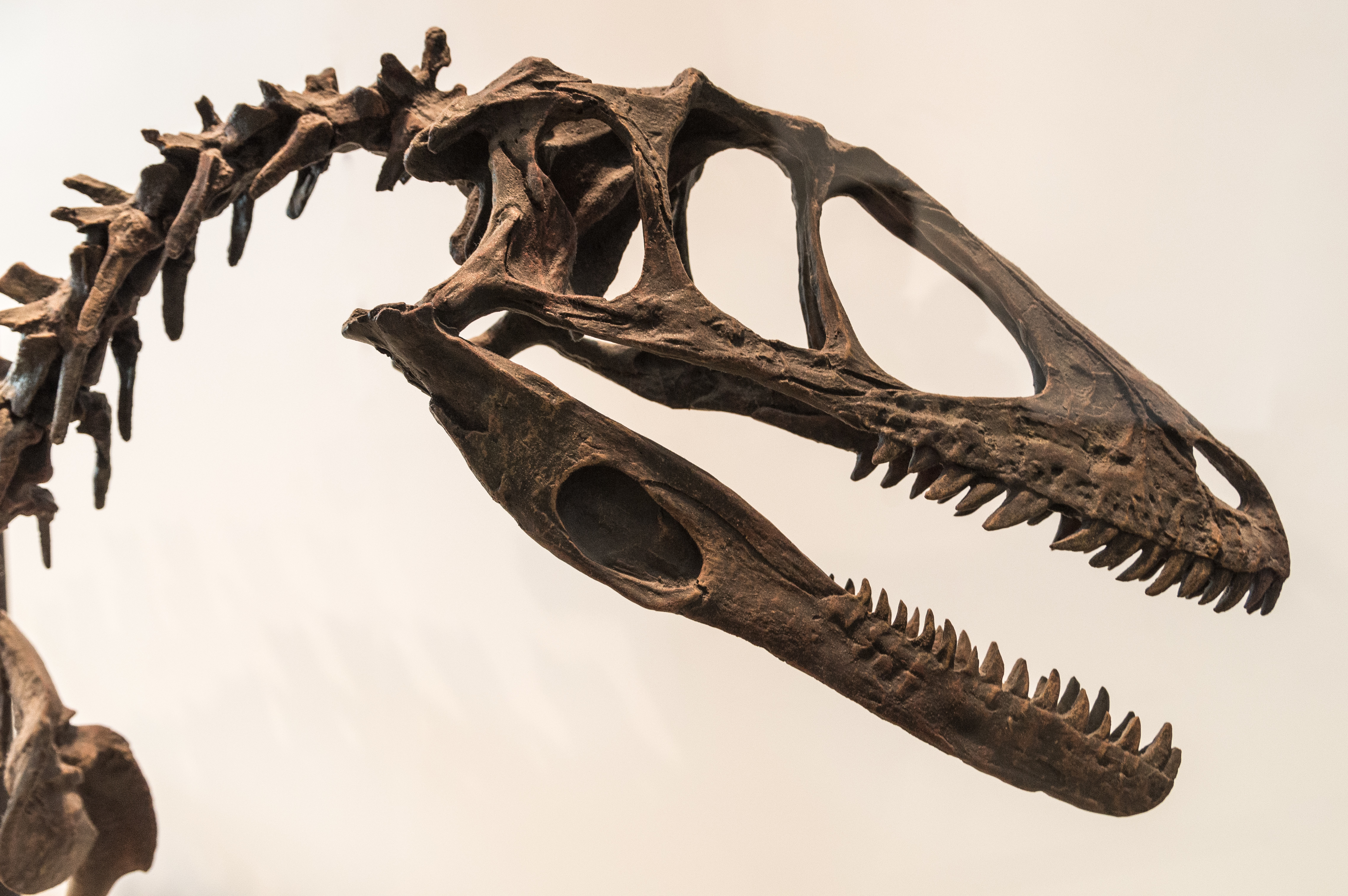
Reconstructed skull and neck, Royal Ontario Museum

Bite force estimates for Deinonychus were first produced in 2005, based on reconstructed jaw musculature. This study concluded that Deinonychus likely had a maximum bite force only 15% that of the modern American alligator. A 2010 study by Paul Gignac and colleagues attempted to estimate the bite force based directly on newly discovered Deinonychus tooth puncture marks in the bones of a Tenontosaurus. These puncture marks came from a large individual, and provided the first evidence that large Deinonychus could bite through bone. Using the tooth marks, Gignac's team were able to determine that the bite force of Deinonychus was significantly higher than earlier studies had estimated by biomechanical studies alone. They found the bite force of Deinonychus to be between 4,100 and 8,200 newtons, greater than living carnivorous mammals including the hyena, and equivalent to a similarly-sized alligator.

However, this estimate has come into question, as it was based on bite marks rather than a Deinonychus skull. A recent 2022 study used a Deinonychus skull for their estimate and calculated 706 N (159 lb_{f}).

Gignac and colleagues also noted, however, that bone puncture marks from Deinonychus are relatively rare, and unlike larger theropods with many known puncture marks like Tyrannosaurus, Deinonychus probably did not frequently bite through or eat bone. Instead, they probably used their strong bite force for defense or to capture prey, rather than for feeding.

A 2024 study by Tse, Miller, and Pittman et al., focusing on the skull morphology and bite forces of various dromaeosaurids discovered that Deinonychus, the largest taxon examined, had a skull that was well adapted to hunting of large vertebrates and delivering powerful bites to prey alongside Dromaeosaurus, to which it was compared. In this study, Deinonychus represented the most extreme specializations compared to other dromaeosaurids when it came to its adaptations. The same study also revealed that Deinonychus' skull was less resistant to bite forces than that of Velociraptor, which apparently was engaging in more scavenging behavior, suggesting high bite force resistance was more common in dromaeosaurid taxa that were obtaining food through scavenging more than engaging in active predation. It is also suggested in these findings that Deinonychus may have fed by using neck-driven pullback movements to dismember carcasses when feeding, akin to modern varanid lizards.

==== Limb function ====
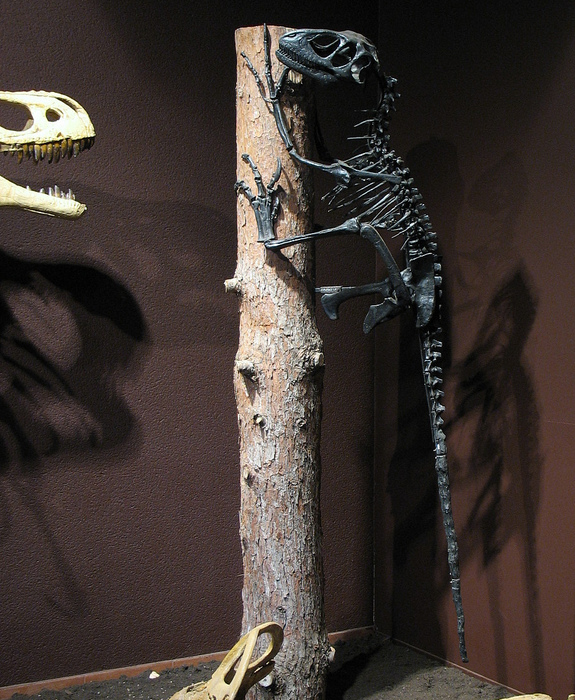
Cast in climbing posture

Despite being the most distinctive feature of Deinonychus, the shape and curvature of the sickle claw varies between specimens. The type specimen described by Ostrom in 1969 has a strongly curved sickle claw, while a newer specimen described in 1976 had a claw with much weaker curvature, more similar in profile with the 'normal' claws on the remaining toes. Ostrom suggested that this difference in the size and shape of the sickle claws could be due to individual, sexual, or age-related variation, but admitted he could not be sure.

There is anatomical and trackway evidence that this talon was held up off the ground while the dinosaur walked on the third and fourth toes.

Ostrom suggested that Deinonychus could kick with the sickle claw to cut and slash at its prey. Some researchers even suggested that the talon was used to disembowel large ceratopsian dinosaurs. Other studies have suggested that the sickle claws were not used to slash but rather to deliver small stabs to the victim. In 2005, Manning and colleagues ran tests on a robotic replica that precisely matched the anatomy of Deinonychus and Velociraptor, and used hydraulic rams to make the robot strike a pig carcass. In these tests, the talons made only shallow punctures and could not cut or slash. The authors suggested that the talons would have been more effective in climbing than in dealing killing blows. In 2009, Manning and colleagues undertook additional analysis dromaeosaur claw function, using a numerical modelling approach to generate a 3D finite element stress/ strain map of a Velociraptor hand claw. They went on to quantitatively evaluate the mechanical behavior of dromaeosaur claws and their function. They state that dromaeosaur claws were well-adapted for climbing as they were resistant to forces acting in a single (longitudinal) plane, due to gravity.

Ostrom compared Deinonychus to the ostrich and cassowary. He noted that the bird species can inflict serious injury with the large claw on the second toe. The cassowary has claws up to 125 mm (4.9 in) long. Ostrom cited Gilliard (1958) in saying that they can sever an arm or disembowel a man. Kofron (1999 and 2003) studied 241 documented cassowary attacks and found that one human and two dogs had been killed, but no evidence that cassowaries can disembowel or dismember other animals. Cassowaries use their claws to defend themselves, to attack threatening animals, and in agonistic displays such as the Bowed Threat Display. The seriema also has an enlarged second toe claw, and uses it to tear apart small prey items for swallowing. In 2011, a study suggested that the sickle claw would likely have been used to pin down prey while biting it, rather than as a slashing weapon.

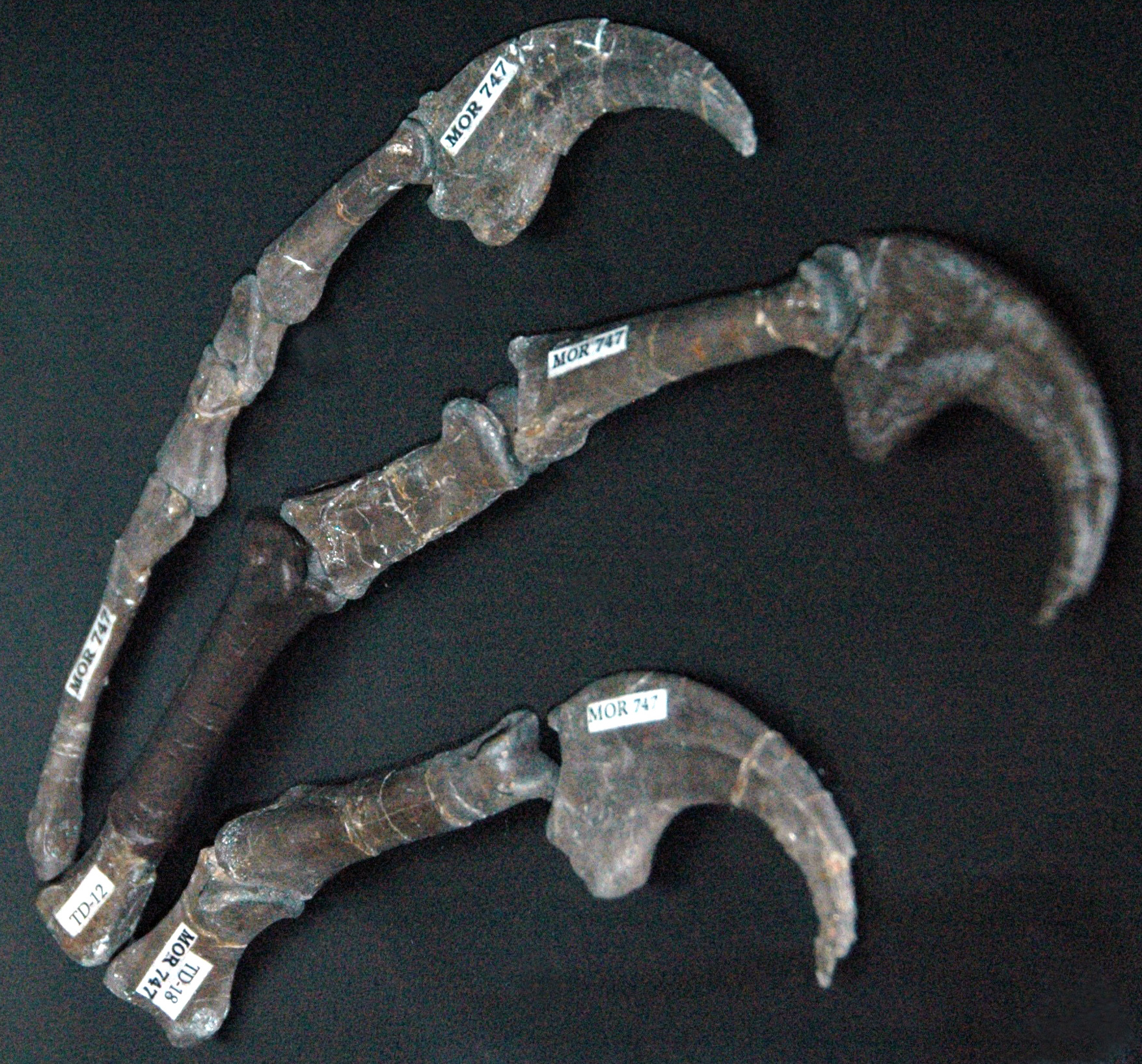
Hand bones of MOR 747

Biomechanical studies by Ken Carpenter in 2002 confirmed that the most likely function of the forelimbs in predation was grasping, as their great lengths would have permitted longer reach than for most other theropods. The rather large and elongated coracoid, indicating powerful muscles in the forelimbs, further strengthened this interpretation. Carpenter's biomechanical studies using bone casts also showed that Deinonychus could not fold its arms against its body like a bird ("avian folding"), contrary to what was inferred from the earlier 1985 descriptions by Jacques Gauthier and Gregory S. Paul in 1988.

Studies by Phil Senter in 2006 indicated that Deinonychus forelimbs could be used not only for grasping, but also for clutching objects towards the chest. If Deinonychus had feathered fingers and wings, the feathers would have limited the range of motion of the forelimbs to some degree. For example, when Deinonychus extended its arm forward, the 'palm' of the hand automatically rotated to an upward-facing position. This would have caused one wing to block the other if both forelimbs were extended at the same time, leading Senter to conclude that clutching objects to the chest would have only been accomplished with one arm at a time. The function of the fingers would also have been limited by feathers; for example, only the third digit of the hand could have been employed in activities such as probing crevices for small prey items, and only in a position perpendicular to the main wing. Alan Gishlick, in a 2001 study of Deinonychus forelimb mechanics, found that even if large wing feathers were present, the grasping ability of the hand would not have been significantly hindered; rather, grasping would have been accomplished perpendicular to the wing, and objects likely would have been held by both hands simultaneously in a "bear hug" fashion, findings which have been supported by the later forelimb studies by Carpenter and Senter. In a 2001 study conducted by Bruce Rothschild and other paleontologists, 43 hand bones and 52 foot bones referred to Deinonychus were examined for signs of stress fracture; none were found. The second phalanx of the second toe in the specimen YPM 5205 has a healed fracture.

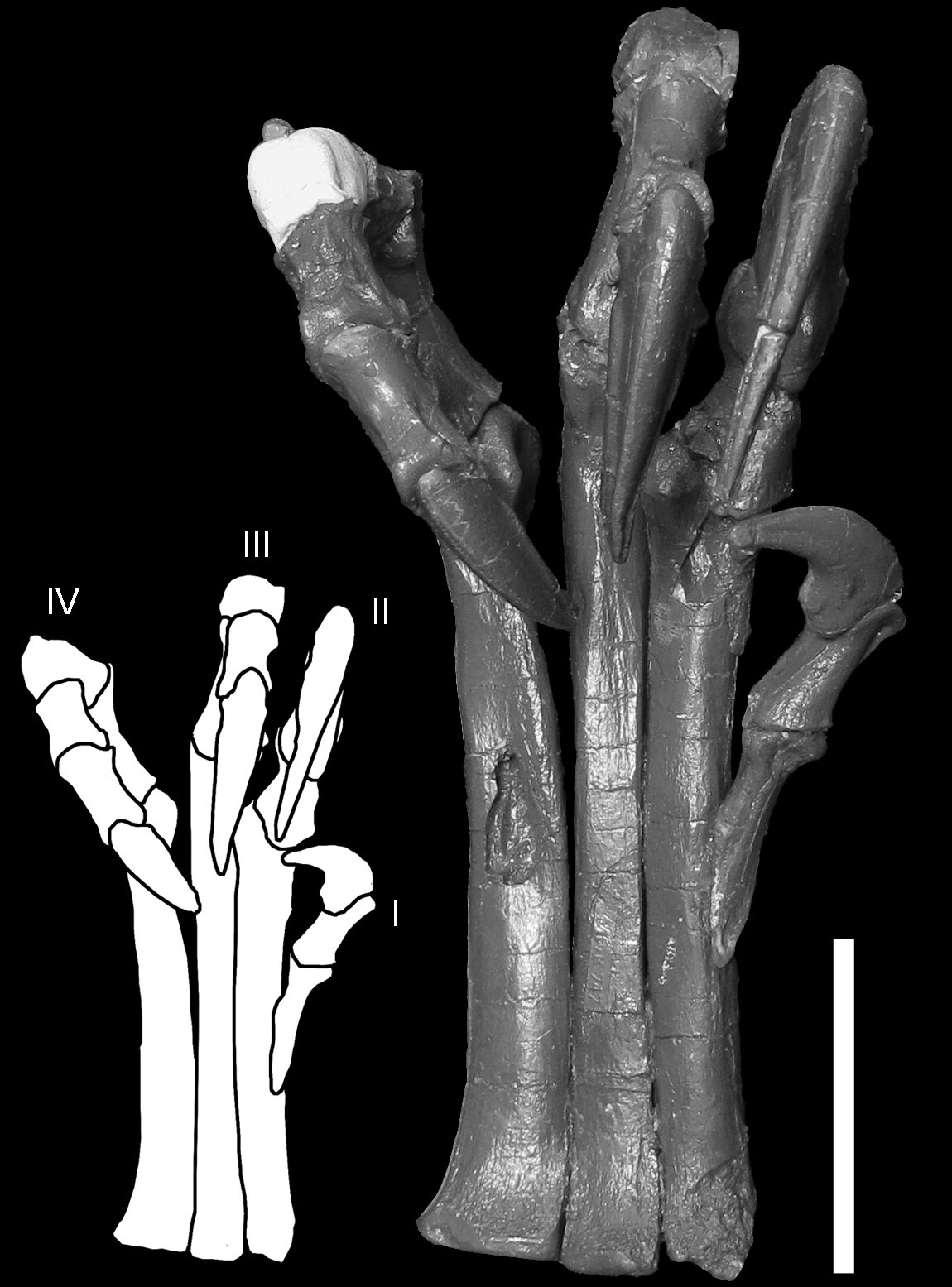
Foot (MOR 747) in flexion

Parsons and Parsons have shown that juvenile and sub-adult specimens of Deinonychus display some morphological differences from the adults. For instance, the arms of the younger specimens were proportionally longer than those of the adults, a possible indication of difference in behavior between young and adults. Another example of this could be the function of the pedal claws. Parsons and Parsons have suggested that the claw curvature (which Ostrom [1976] had already shown was different between specimens) maybe was greater for juvenile Deinonychus, as this could help it climb in trees, and that the claws became straighter as the animal became older and started to live solely on the ground. This was based on the hypothesis that some small dromaeosaurids used their pedal claws for climbing.

=== Locomotion ===
Dromaeosaurids, especially Deinonychus, are often depicted as unusually fast-running animals in the popular media, and Ostrom himself speculated that Deinonychus was fleet-footed in his original description. However, when first described, a complete leg of Deinonychus had not been found, and Ostrom's speculation about the length of the femur (upper leg bone) later proved to have been an overestimate. In a later study, Ostrom noted that the ratio of the femur to the tibia (lower leg bone) is not as important in determining speed as the relative length of the foot and lower leg. In modern fleet-footed birds, like the ostrich, the foot-tibia ratio is .95. In unusually fast-running dinosaurs, like Struthiomimus, the ratio is .68, but in Deinonychus the ratio is .48. Ostrom stated that the "only reasonable conclusion" is that Deinonychus, while far from slow-moving, was not particularly fast compared to other dinosaurs, and certainly not as fast as modern flightless birds.

The low foot to lower leg ratio in Deinonychus is due partly to an unusually short metatarsus (upper foot bones). The ratio is actually larger in smaller individuals than in larger ones. Ostrom suggested that the short metatarsus may be related to the function of the sickle claw, and used the fact that it appears to get shorter as individuals aged as support for this. He interpreted all these features—the short second toe with enlarged claw, short metatarsus, etc.—as support for the use of the hind leg as an offensive weapon, where the sickle claw would strike downwards and backwards, and the leg pulled back and down at the same time, slashing and tearing at the prey. Ostrom suggested that the short metatarsus reduced overall stress on the leg bones during such an attack, and interpreted the unusual arrangement of muscle attachments in the Deinonychus leg as support for his idea that a different set of muscles was used in the predatory stroke than in walking or running. Therefore, Ostrom concluded that the legs of Deinonychus represented a balance between running adaptations needed for an agile predator, and stress-reducing features to compensate for its unique foot weapon.

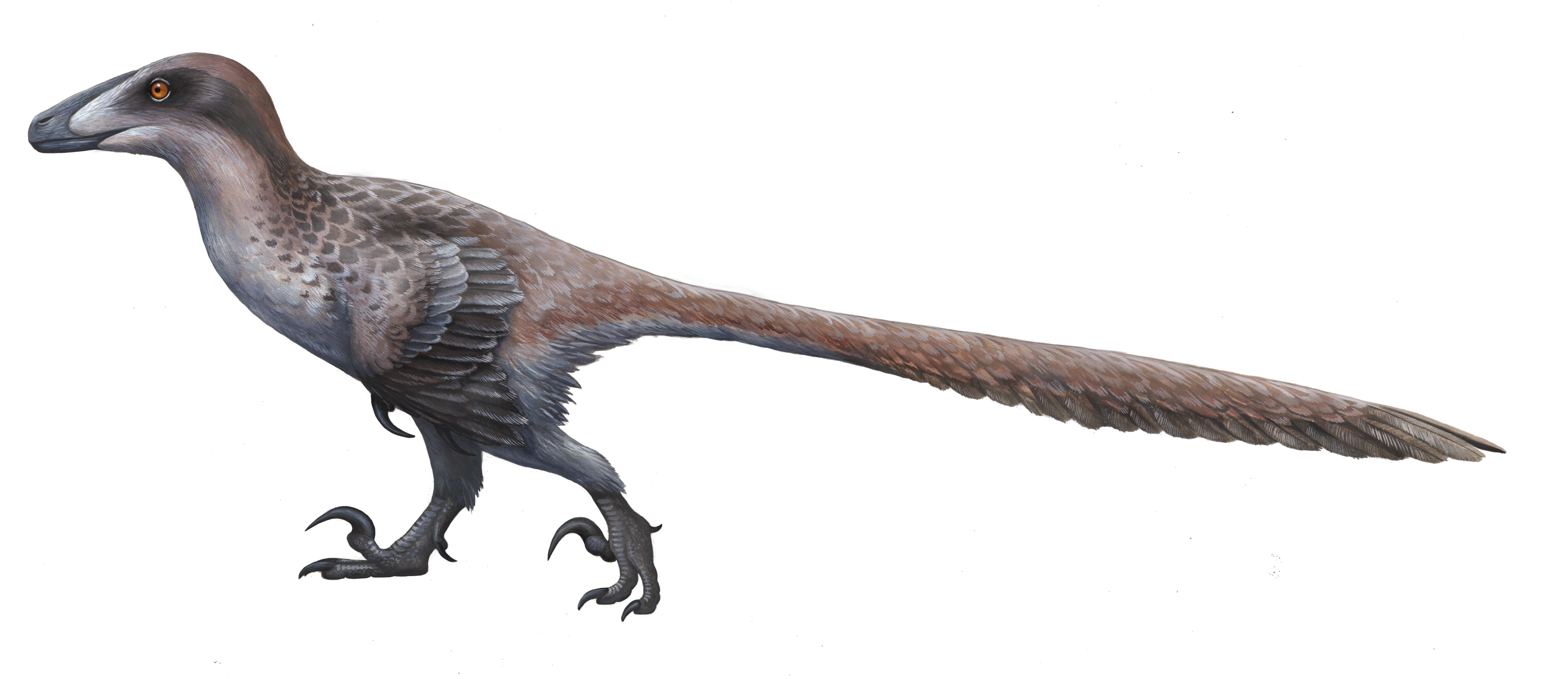
Restoration of a walking individual

In his 1981 study of Canadian dinosaur footprints, Richard Kool produced rough walking speed estimates based on several trackways made by different species in the Gething Formation of British Columbia. Kool estimated one of these trackways, representing the ichnospecies Irenichnites gracilis (which may have been made by Deinonychus), to have a walking speed of 10.1 kilometers per hour (6 miles per hour).

In a 2015 paper, it was reported after further analysis of immature fossils that the open and mobile nature of the shoulder joint might have meant that young Deinonychus were capable of some form of flight.

In 2016, Scott Persons IV and Currie examined the limb proportion of numerous theropods and found Dromaeosaurids weren't cursorial animals due to their low CLP scores, with Deinonychus scoring -2.2, suggesting they couldn't maintain high speeds for extended periods of time.

=== Eggs ===
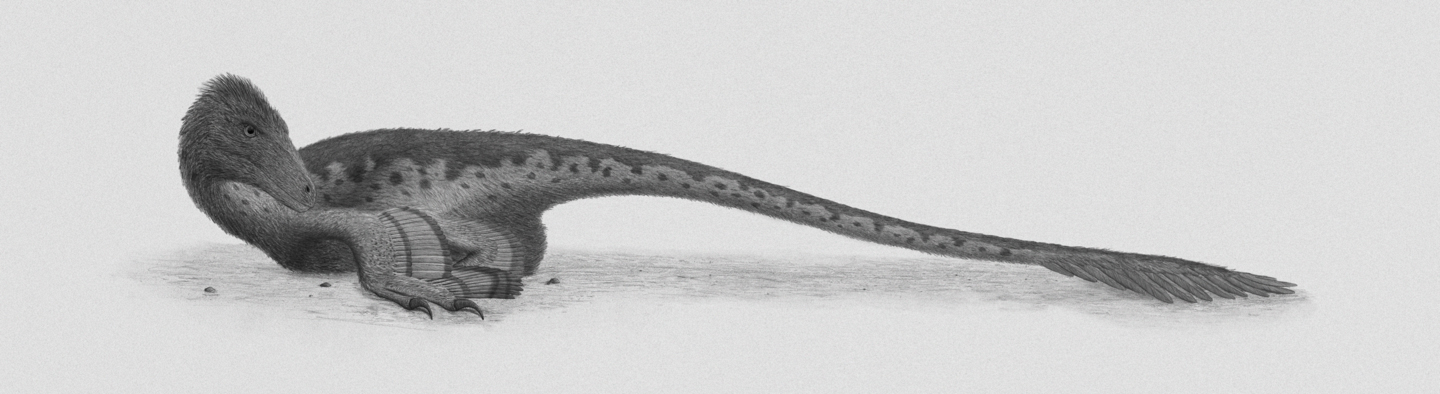
Artist's impression of an individual in brooding position

The identification, in 2000, of a probable Deinonychus egg associated with one of the original specimens allowed comparison with other theropod dinosaurs in terms of egg structure, nesting, and reproduction. In their 2006 examination of the specimen, Grellet-Tinner and Makovicky examined the possibility that the dromaeosaurid had been feeding on the egg, or that the egg fragments had been associated with the Deinonychus skeleton by coincidence. They dismissed the idea that the egg had been a meal for the theropod, noting that the fragments were sandwiched between the belly ribs and forelimb bones, making it impossible that they represented contents of the animal's stomach. In addition, the manner in which the egg had been crushed and fragmented indicated that it had been intact at the time of burial, and was broken by the fossilization process. The idea that the egg was randomly associated with the dinosaur was also found to be unlikely; the bones surrounding the egg had not been scattered or disarticulated, but remained fairly intact relative to their positions in life, indicating that the area around and including the egg was not disturbed during preservation. The fact that these bones were belly ribs (gastralia), which are very rarely found articulated, supported this interpretation. All the evidence, according to Grellet-Tinner and Makovicky, indicates that the egg was intact beneath the body of the Deinonychus when it was buried. It is possible that this represents brooding or nesting behavior in Deinonychus similar to that seen in the related troodontids and oviraptorids, or that the egg was in fact inside the oviduct when the animal died.

Examination of the Deinonychus egg's microstructure confirms that it belonged to a theropod, since it shares characteristics with other known theropod eggs and shows dissimilarities with ornithischian and sauropod eggs. Compared to other maniraptoran theropods, the egg of Deinonychus is more similar to those of oviraptorids than to those of troodontids, despite studies that show the latter are more closely related to dromaeosaurids like Deinonychus. While the egg was too badly crushed to accurately determine its size, Grellet-Tinner and Makovicky estimated a diameter of about 7 cm (2.8 in) based on the width of the pelvic canal through which the egg had to have passed. This size is similar to the 7.2 cm (2.8 in) diameter of the largest Citipati (an oviraptorid) eggs; Citipati and Deinonychus also shared the same overall body size, supporting this estimate. Additionally, the thicknesses of Citipati and Deinonychus eggshells are almost identical, and since shell thickness correlates with egg volume, this further supports the idea that the eggs of these two animals were about the same size.

A study published in November 2018 by Norell, Yang and Wiemann et al., indicates that Deinonychus laid blue eggs, likely to camouflage them as well as creating open nests. The study also indicates that Deinonychus and other dinosaurs that created open nests likely represent an origin of color in modern bird eggs as an adaptation both for recognition and camouflage against predators.

=== Social behavior ===
Scientists have debated whether or not Deinonychus was gregarious.

Deinonychus teeth found in association with fossils of the ornithopod dinosaur Tenontosaurus are quite common in the Cloverly Formation. Two quarries have been discovered that preserve fairly complete Deinonychus fossils near Tenontosaurus fossils. The first, the Yale quarry in the Cloverly of Montana, includes numerous teeth, four adult Deinonychus and one juvenile Deinonychus. The association of this number of Deinonychus skeletons in a single quarry suggests that Deinonychus may have fed on that animal, and perhaps hunted it. Ostrom and Maxwell have even used this information to speculate that Deinonychus might have lived and hunted in packs. The second such quarry is from the Antlers Formation of Oklahoma. The site contains six partial skeletons of Tenontosaurus of various sizes, along with one partial skeleton and many teeth of Deinonychus. One tenontosaur humerus even bears what might be Deinonychus tooth marks. Brinkman et al. (1998) point out that Deinonychus had an adult mass of 70–100 kg (150–220 lb), whereas adult tenontosaurs were 1–4 metric tons. (Note: A more recent estimate puts Tenontosaurus at roughly 1 ton.) A solitary Deinonychus could not kill an adult tenontosaur, suggesting that pack hunting is possible.

A 2007 study by Roach and Brinkman has called into question the gregariousness and cooperative pack hunting behavior of Deinonychus, based on what the authors assumed about modern carnivore hunting and the taphonomy of tenontosaur sites. The authors claimed that archosaurs (birds and crocodiles) and Komodo dragons typically display little cooperative hunting, arguing that they are only capable of solitary hunting or are drawn to previously killed carcasses, where much conflict occurs between individuals of the same species. For example, in situations where groups of Komodo dragons are eating together, the largest individuals eat first and will attack smaller Komodos that attempt to feed; if the smaller animal is killed, it is cannibalized. When this information is applied to the tenontosaur sites, it appears that what is found is consistent with Deinonychus having a Komodo-like feeding strategy. Deinonychus skeletal remains found at these sites are from subadults, with missing parts consistent with having been eaten by other Deinonychus.

Currie and Eberth criticized Roach and Brinkman (2007) in their 2010 paper, pointing out that many gregarious carnivores are very intolerant towards conspecifics yet still develop complex, social behavior. Li et al. describes track sites in their 2007 paper, noting the similar foot spacing and parallel trackways, implying gregarious pack behavior instead of uncoordinated feeding behavior.

A carbon isotopic analysis on Deinonychus teeth suggests precociality in the genus. The isotopes found for different aged specimens indicate that adults and juveniles had different diets across the various age groups, suggesting a more typical archosaurian set of life stages, with any parental feeding of young ending before the young were large enough to sustain the typical adult diet. The examinations also suggests a lack of mammal-like (Note: Mammal-like packs within this study is exclusive to wolf packs, other gregarious Carnivorans such as Lions, Spotted Hyenas, and Dholes have vastly different structured groups) pack hunting in Deinonychus. Despite this, due to the lack of spatial separation of juvenile and adults, Deinonychus was likely gregarious, having social tolerance at least that of crocodilians, instead of a complete agonistic relationship as seen in Komodo dragons. They argued due to some adults having overlapping values with smaller individuals, Deinonychus probably was not monogamous and instead practiced ratite-like parental care.

== Paleoenvironment ==
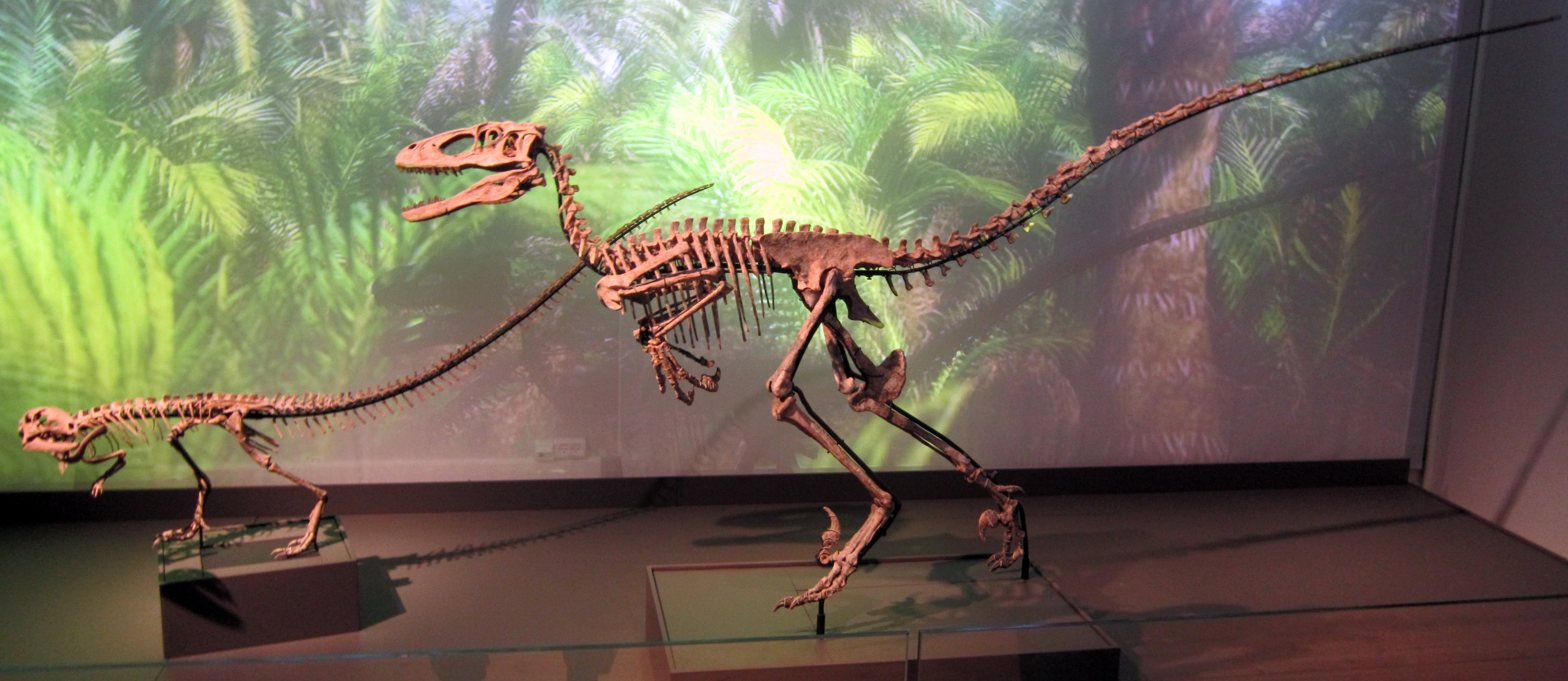
Mounted skeletons of Deinonychus and the contemporary Zephyrosaurus (left), Natural History Museum of Denmark

Geological evidence suggests that Deinonychus inhabited a floodplain or swamplike habitat. The paleoenvironment of both the upper Cloverly Formation and the Antlers Formation, in which remains of Deinonychus have been found, consisted of tropical or sub-tropical forests, deltas and lagoons, perhaps similar to the environment of modern-day Louisiana. Other animals Deinonychus shared its world with include herbivorous dinosaurs such as the nodosaurid Sauropelta and the ornithopods Zephyrosaurus and Tenontosaurus. In Oklahoma, the ecosystem of Deinonychus also included the large theropod Acrocanthosaurus, the huge sauropod Sauroposeidon, the crocodilians Goniopholis and Paluxysuchus, and the gar Lepisosteus. If the teeth found in Maryland are those of Deinonychus, then its contemporaries would include the sauropod Astrodon and the poorly-known nodosaur Priconodon. The middle portion of the Cloverly Formation ranges in age from 115 ± 10 Ma near the base to 93 ± 8 Ma near the top.

Deinonychus inhabited humid environments with extensive forest cover. During the Albian, much of North America was blanketed by vast forests composed of diverse plant life. The canopy was dominated by trees such as pines, redwoods, araucarians, cheirolepidiaceans, ginkgos, yews, taxodioids, athrotaxidoids, podocarps, plane trees (sycamores), magnoliales, laurales, fabids, malvids, Tempskyaceae ferns, and Cyatheales ferns. The forest floor supported a rich understory of palms, cycads, cycadeoids, horsetails, forked ferns, spleenworts, and Osmundaceae ferns. More open areas would have been home to the fern known as Ruffordia. These plants would have sustained the many types of herbivores Deinonychus hunted such as Tenontosaurus.

== Cultural significance ==
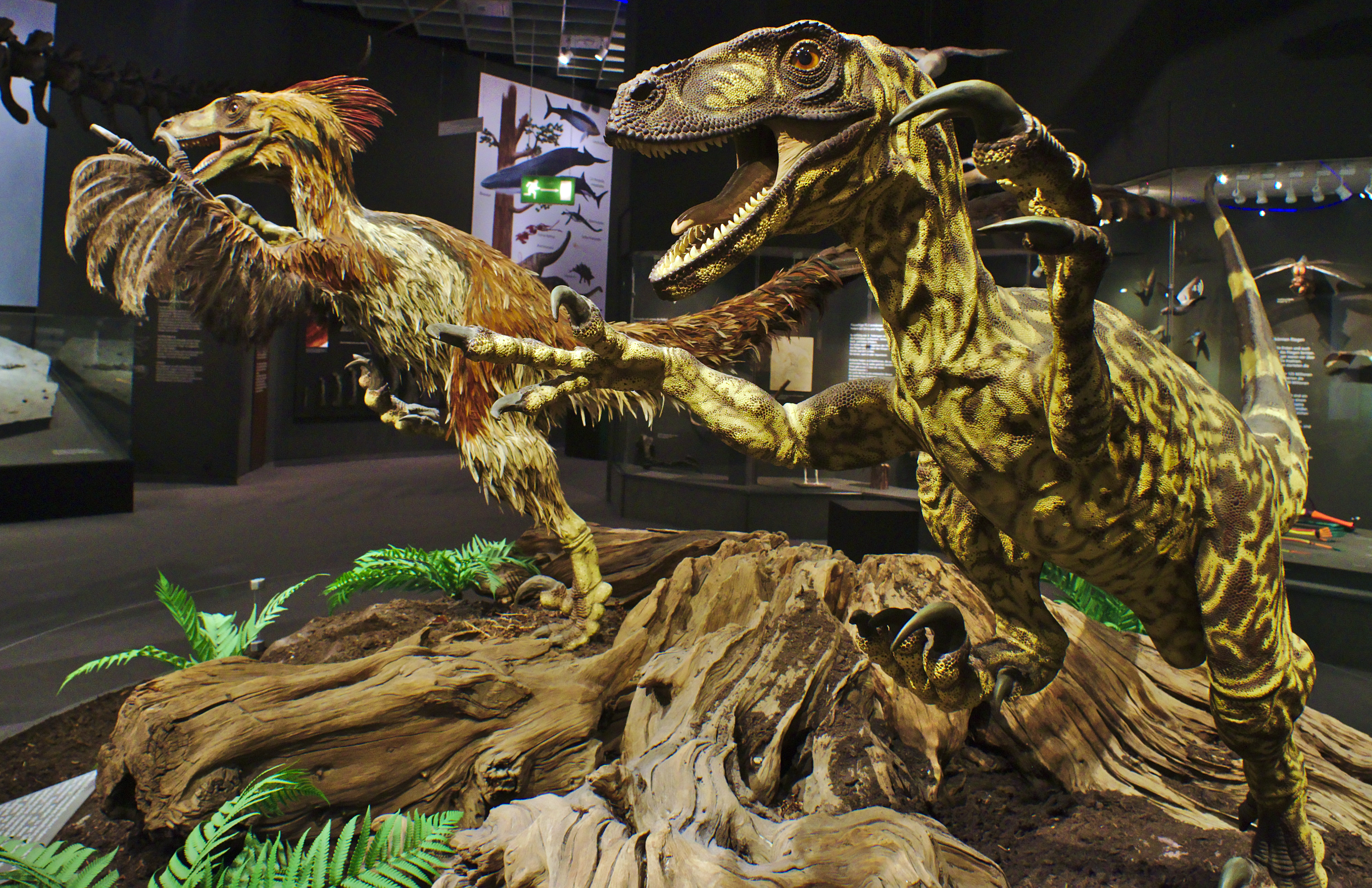
Feathered model adjacent to an earlier, featherless model from the Westphalian Museum of Natural History

Deinonychus were featured prominently in Harry Adam Knight's novel Carnosaur and its film adaption, and Michael Crichton's novels Jurassic Park and The Lost World, as well as the franchise adapted from the novels. Crichton ultimately chose to use the name Velociraptor for these dinosaurs, rather than Deinonychus. Crichton had met with John Ostrom several times during the writing process to discuss details of the possible range of behaviors and life appearance of Deinonychus. Crichton at one point apologetically told Ostrom that he had decided to use the name Velociraptor in place of Deinonychus for his book, because he felt the former name was "more dramatic". Despite this, according to Ostrom, Crichton stated that the Velociraptor of the novel was based on Deinonychus in almost every detail, and that only the name had been changed.

The Jurassic Park filmmakers followed suit, designing the film's models based almost entirely on Deinonychus instead of the actual Velociraptor, and they reportedly requested all of Ostrom's published papers on Deinonychus during production. As a result, they portrayed the film's dinosaurs with the proportions and snout shape of a large Deinonychus. The six-metre-long (20-foot) Utahraptor is commonly considered to be a closer match to the film's dinosaurs in terms of size, as they are larger than the known Deinonychus specimens were in life.

== See also ==
- Dromaeosauridae
- Timeline of dromaeosaurid research
