= Carnosaur 2 =

- VHS cover
- Directed by: Louis Morneau
- Written by: Michael Palmer
- Produced by: Mike Elliott
- Starring: John Savage; Cliff DeYoung; Rick Dean; Ryan Thomas Johnson; Arabella Holzbog; Don Stroud
- Cinematography: John Aronson
- Edited by: Roderick Davis
- Music by: Ed Tomney
- Distributed by: New Horizons
- Release date: February 15, 1995
- Running time: 83 minutes
- Country: United States
- Language: English
- Budget: $800,000

Carnosaur 2 is a 1995 action horror film directed by Louis Morneau, and the sequel to the 1993 film Carnosaur. It is the second installment in the Carnosaur film series. It stars John Savage, Cliff DeYoung, Rick Dean, Ryan Thomas Johnson, Arabella Holzbog and Don Stroud. The film is about a team of technicians who go to the Yucca Mountain nuclear waste repository to investigate problems concerning power and communications. They discover that the facility has been overrun by cloned dinosaurs. The film's plot shares many similarities with the 1986 film Aliens.

Before its predecessor had completed production, Carnosaur 2 was already being planned by executive producer Roger Corman. Effects artist John Buechler returned for the sequel, which re-used his dinosaur models from the original Carnosaur. Filming took place during an 18-day shoot, including a week of filming at a power plant near Castaic Lake in California. Carnosaur 2 was released direct-to-video on February 15, 1995. It received mixed reviews; criticism was aimed at its special effects, although the cast was generally praised. The film was followed by a sequel, Carnosaur 3: Primal Species, in 1996.

== Plot ==
At a desert facility called the Yucca Mountain nuclear waste repository, orphaned teenage hacker Jesse is caught trying to steal dynamite. His uncle Joe, a worker at the site, stops him. That night, unknown animals appear at the facility's mess hall and kill everyone except Jesse.

When communications from the facility cease, a repair team of civilian technicians are called in to investigate, as the site had been experiencing power issues. The team's leader, Major Tom McQuade of the Department of Defense, explains that Yucca Mountain is a military operated uranium mine, usually off limits to civilians. However, the facility has a schedule to keep, and the group was the closest team available on such short notice. The investigators find the place deserted; three go to the control room to try to reboot the computer system, while the other three form a search party. They locate Jesse, catatonic and in a state of shock, and take him to the control room.

The team realizes that the issues with the communications equipment cannot be resolved from the control room, concluding that they must venture down into the facility to find the cause of the problem. Although the lowest levels are classified, the team proceeds to investigate them as well, despite objections from McQuade. Helicopter pilot Galloway and computer expert Moses stay in the control center with Jesse. When an animal kills team member Kahane, the rest of the crew flee the lower floors. Jesse, listening to their radio chatter, realizes what happened and flees the room just before a Velociraptor appears and kills Moses. Galloway flees to the helicopter and starts the engine. Before the crew can reach her, a Velociraptor in the back seat attacks her. During a struggle, the helicopter is inadvertently lifted. The dinosaur kills Galloway and the helicopter crashes, stranding the crew.

The group returns to the control room. They demand answers from McQuade, who reluctantly reveals the dinosaurs' origins: two months earlier, a biotech firm had been working with fossilized DNA and genetic experiments, finding a way to recreate dinosaurs. The government had sent in a team to contain the situation, and dozens of eggs were discovered and were stored at Yucca Mountain. The dinosaurs later hatched and killed the facility workers. Jesse informs the team of the facility's dynamite, and they decide to use it to blow up the plant and its dinosaurs, despite McQuade's objections. McQuade eventually says that the lower levels of the facility are a repository for atomic waste, including dozens of warheads. Radiation is now leaking from a containment unit, damaged by the dinosaurs, and a repository failure will occur in less than two hours, potentially setting off the warheads.

Jesse devises a plan to crash the computers to send the site into emergency mode, which should get an evacuation squad to rescue them. Following the plan, the group begins making their way back to the surface, using dynamite rigged with tripwires to hold off the dinosaurs while getting to the elevator. A Velociraptor breaks into the elevator and kills Rawlins. The elevator's cables snap and it crashes. After they escape the elevator, Monk is injured as he accidentally activates a tripwire while fleeing from a Velociraptor. Too injured to walk, Monk and McQuade blow themselves up to kill the remaining Velociraptors.

Jesse and Reed continue onward, but Reed trips over a wire and dangles from a platform, eventually suffering a long fall. Jesse reaches the surface and finds the evacuation team waiting, but they refuse to retrieve Reed due to the facility's imminent explosion. Jesse runs back in himself and helps Reed. En route to the rescue helicopter, they narrowly avoid a Tyrannosaurus rex.

Jesse runs back and grabs the remote detonator to trigger the remaining dynamite. The T. rex bursts out of the building and kills a rescue team member. Jesse gets in a telescopic handler and uses it to battle the dinosaur, eventually pushing it down an elevator shaft. The helicopter takes off, and Jesse detonates the rest of the dynamite, destroying the facility and preventing a meltdown.

== Cast ==
- John Savage as Jack Reed
- Cliff DeYoung as Tom McQuade
- Don Stroud as Ben Kahane
- Rick Dean as "Monk" Brody
- Ryan Thomas Johnson as Jesse Turner
- Arabella Holzbog as Sarah Rawlins
- Miguel A. Núñez Jr. as Ed Moses
- Neith Hunter as Joanne Galloway
- Guy Boyd as Joe Walker
- Michael James McDonald as Evac Helicopter Pilot

== Production and release ==
Before the completion of Carnosaur (1993), executive producer Roger Corman already wanted a sequel. Carnosaur 2 writer Michael Palmer said that everybody felt the first film would do well, and Roger wanted to be ready with a sequel. Effects artist John Carl Buechler said that because Carnosaur was the most successful film ever made by Corman and his company New Horizons, they had to make a sequel. Palmer's first draft of the script was finished in three weeks, and it underwent two rewrites. The film's ending battle, with a T. rex against a forklift, is a recreation of its predecessor's finale. While Carnosaur is considered a horror film, Palmer wrote the sequel as an action film, although some reviewers consider it a horror film as well. The sequel's plot has many similarities to the 1986 film Aliens, directed by James Cameron.

Carnosaur 2 was directed by Louis Morneau, who originally was going to direct the first film, but had to pass because of commitment to another project. For the cast, John Savage and Don Stroud were Morneau's first choices. The film's budget was similar to its predecessor, which had a reported budget between $800,000 and $1.5 million. Like the original film, shooting lasted 18 days. This included a week of filming at a power plant near Castaic Lake in California. Steadicam was used for a large portion of the filming. Shooting typically lasted 12 to 16 hours a day.

Buechler and Magical Media Industries returned to create the special effects for Carnosaur 2, which re-used the same dinosaur models from the first film, saving the production team money. The dinosaurs had been made with foam latex, which has a limited lifespan. The dinosaurs' mechanical parts also did not move as accurately, as a year had passed since the models were created. The dinosaurs received touch-ups for Carnosaur 2. The Velociraptors were portrayed through puppetry and a creature suit; the latter was altered to make the animals look more like the raptors in Jurassic Park. Miniature effects, created by Anthony Doublin, were also used on the film. Buechler had more freedom on Carnosaur 2 compared to its predecessor. After filming, a week of post-production work was spent working on the dinosaur effects.

Originally, Corman planned to release the film theatrically in autumn 1994, although it eventually was released direct-to-video on February 15, 1995. It was released on DVD on April 18, 2000.

== Reception ==
The Houston Chronicle wrote that the film "takes an exploitation-film approach to Jurassic Park. That is to say, it's cheap and shamelessly derivative. Yet it also sports a fine cast, including two-time Oscar nominee John Savage, and is galvanized by the scrappy resourcefulness and unpretentious spirit that low-budget filmmaking allows". The New York Daily News considered Carnosaur 2 an improvement over the original film, and praised the cast, especially Savage and Stroud. Missoulian criticized the special effects but praised Savage's performance, and wrote that the film was done with "energy and a bit of style and a tiny bit of wit". J.R. Taylor of Entertainment Weekly gave the film a "B+" and called it an "Aliens rip-off".

Brian J. Dillard of AllMovie rated it one star out of five and criticized the dinosaur effects, while stating: "The best that can be said of Carnosaur 2 is that it gives good gore". TV Guide considered the film derivative and predictable, rating it two stars out of five. It wrote that Morneau and the cast "do what they can, but their efforts are further hamstrung by the lack of menacing monsters". TV Guide stated that the dinosaurs "look no more realistic than they did in the first film, but at least Morneau appears to recognize this, and films their attacks in quick flashes for the first half of the movie".

Critic John Kenneth Muir, in 2011, rated it one and a half stars out of four, and noted the similarities with Aliens. He considered the film an improvement over its predecessor, calling the sets "decent" and stating that the cast performances were largely acceptable. He also made note of Rawlins' death: "Before this scene, she had 'final girl' written all over her, so her death is authentically surprising".

In 2013, critic Mike Mayo wrote that the acting was above average, and that Morneau "keeps things moving quickly enough that the plot lapses and less-than-stellar special effects aren't fatal". Mayo also stated that the film's dialogue has "that gritty quality" that made Cameron's early films "so much fun".

== See also ==
- List of films featuring dinosaurs
