= The Fungus =

1985 novel by Harry Adam Knight

- Author: Harry Adam Knight
- Language: English
- Genre: Science fiction, horror
- Published: 1985
- Publication place: United Kingdom

The Fungus is a horror novel by Australian writer Harry Adam Knight, published in 1985.

== Plot summary ==
A scientist attempting to solve world hunger creates a fungus that mutates and spreads across all of England.

== Reception ==
Dave Langford reviewed The Fungus for White Dwarf #66, and called it "revolting".

== Reviews ==
- Review by Richard E. Geis (1985) in Science Fiction Review, Winter 1985
- Review by Tom Whitmore (1989) in Locus, #345, October 1989
- Review by Terry Broome (1990) in Paperback Inferno, #85
- Review by Justin Marriott (2020) in Pulp Horror: All Reviews Special Edition
