= Necessary Evil (2008 film) =

- Directed by: Peter J. Eaton
- Written by: Eric Feldman; Christopher James Harvill
- Produced by: Art of War Films
- Starring: Frank Novak; Donald Agnelli
- Release date: 31 December 2008
- Running time: 87 minutes
- Country: United States
- Language: English
- Budget: $915,000

Necessary Evil is a 2008 American thriller film. It was directed by Peter J. Eaton, written by Eric Feldman and Christopher James Harvill, starring Frank Novak, Donald Agnelli and Lance Henriksen. The film is also known under the title Sabotage in the United States, and Species Evil in Japan.

== Cast ==
- Frank Novak as Army General
- Lance Henriksen as Dr. Fibian
- Donald Agnelli as Albert Fielding
- Greg Collins as Michael Russo
- Danny Trejo as Barro
- Drue Delio as Mental patient
- James DuMont as Officer #1
- Mark Casimir Dyniewicz Jr. as Interrogator #2
- Evan Elliot as Ronald Benjamin
- Eric Feldman as Russo
- Kathryn Fiore as Deborah
- Aaron Fors as Stephen Green
- Daniele Gaither as Gail
