= Elina Madison =

American actress, writer and producer (born 1976)

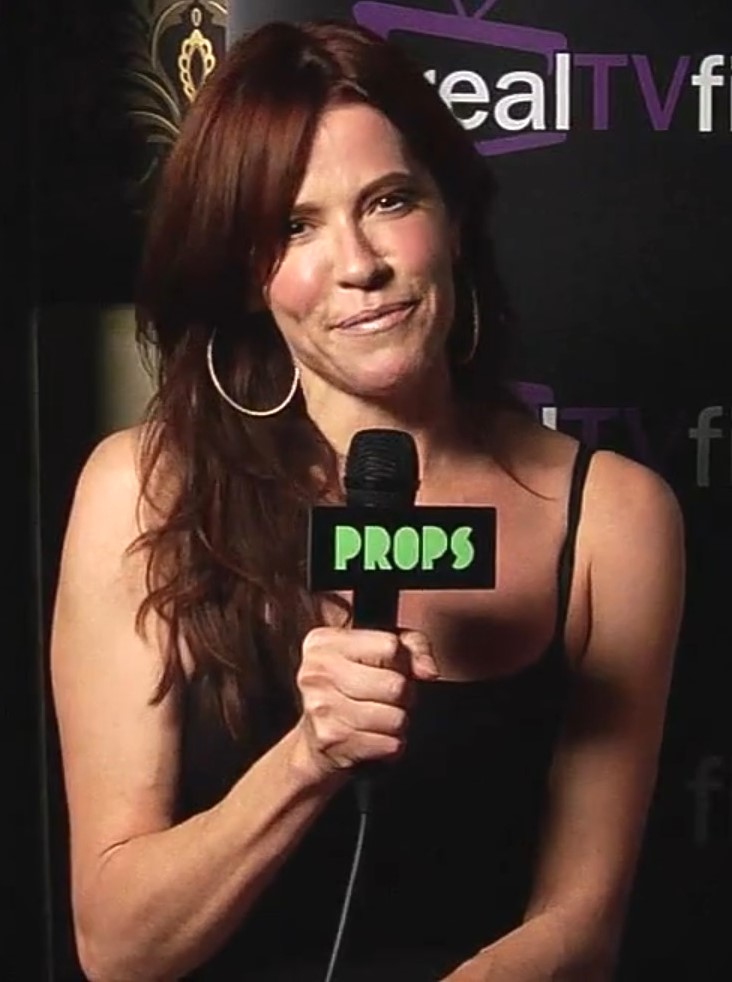
- Madison in 2012
- Born: September 27, 1976 (age 49)
- Occupations: actress, writer, and producer
- Known for: Scream Queen
- Children: Lillian Trow

Elina Madison is an American actress, writer and producer.

== Early life ==
Madison was born on September 27, 1976, in Sioux City, Iowa, and showed a passion for acting at a very young age and knew early on that she was going to be an actress. At the age of 17, she moved to Los Angeles to pursue her career. Madison graduated the two-year theater training program at the Joanne Baron/DW Brown Acting Studio in Santa Monica, California. She also studied at The Stella Adler Academy and The Groundlings Comedy and later with Susan Strasberg. With her unique looks born from her Mexican/Spanish/Norwegian/Czech heritage, she was signed by the prestigious Elite Model Agency and began a career as an international fashion model. Madison walked the runways for Calvin Klein, Krizia in fashion shows in Paris, Japan as well as New York and Los Angeles.

== Career ==
Madison made her film debut in the Tom Hanks film That Thing You Do (1996) in the role of Carlita the Go-Go Dancer. Noted director Zalman King ( 9 ½ Weeks) saw Madison and cast her as one of the leads in the film "Shame, Shame, Shame" as well as the long-running series The Red Show Diaries.

Madison began working associations with noted horror film producers John Carl Buechler and Creep Creepersin, appearing in such films as the remake of The Strange Case of Dr. Jekyll and Mr. Hyde as well as producing and starring in Corporate Cut Throat Massacre and the classic Creepshow 3. Other notable television credits include guest star roles on the ABC television series Brothers and Sisters and opposite James Caan on the NBC series Las Vegas. Other reoccurring roles on Untold Stories of the ER, Mystery ER, National Geographic, Nickelodeon and The Discovery Channel with over 100 credits on her resume.

Madison next worked with legendary director David Lynch on the Academy Award nominated film "Mulholland Drive" starring Naomi Watts and Justin Theroux. Other notable independent film projects include Small Town Saturday Night opposite Chris Pine (Star Trek) and Academy Award nominee John Hawkes.

In the year 2012, M. Madison appeared in the films Barracuda, Huff starring Charlie O'Connell and the comedy Halloween Party. She also stars in Creep Creepersin’s Dracula and the thriller film The Black Tape. Madison continues to model and is now one of the faces for the new clothing line T.I.T.T.L.

== Filmography ==
- 2013 Creep Creepersin's Dracula as Francine
- 2012 Huff as Lorelei
- 2012 Blood Relatives – The Ties That Bind (TV Series) as Susan Montemayor
- 2012 The Brides of Sodom as Leda
- 2011 Night and Day (short) as Jessica
- 2011 Storyteller of Terror as Alicia Walker
- 2011 Chop as Tommy
- 2011 Killer Outbreaks (TV series) as Karen Neal, CDC
- 2011 Halloween Party as Cave Girl
- 2011 Ding Dong Dead as Claudia
- 2011 The Girl with No Number as Connie Mallory
- 2010 Spark Riders as Madison Conner
- 2010 Orgy of Blood as The Woman Who Isn't Her Mother
- 2010 1000 Ways to Die (TV series) as Tiffany (2010)
- 2010 Ripped Memories as Elenita
- 2010 Barracuda as Lisa
- 2010 Small Town Saturday Night as Angie Francis
- 2009 The Corporate Cut Throat Massacre as Brandi Babcock
- 2009 Caged Lesbos A-Go-Go as Jessica Franco
- 2009 Your Kid Ate What? (TV series) as Nurse
- 2009 Minty: The Assassin as "Minty"
- 2009 Someone's Knocking at the Door as Wilma Hopper
- 2009 The Finest Hour as Kitt
- 2008 Chrysalis as Solda
- 2008 From a Place of Darkness as Tall Hooker
- 2008 Kissing Cousins as Stacy, The Meter Maid
- 2007 Murder by the Book (TV series documentary) as Judy
- 2007 Devil Girl as Edie
- 2007 The Metrosexual as Brie, The Dancer
- 2007 Brothers & Sisters (TV series) as Stephanie Jones-Reed
- 2007 Stand Up as Jen
- 2006 Look @ Me as Tina
- 2006 The Strange Case of Dr. Jekyll and Mr. Hyde as Cindy Shivers
- 2006 The Eden Formula (TV movie) as Connie
- 2004 Black Tie Nights (TV series) as Allison
- 2004 Galaxy Hunter as Monica
