= The Eden Formula =

- DVD cover
- Written by: John Carl Buechler
- Directed by: John Carl Buechler
- Starring: Jeff Fahey; Dee Wallace; Tony Todd
- Music by: Andy Garfield
- Country of origin: United States

Production
- Producers: Peter Davy; Debbie Chen
- Cinematography: James Legoy
- Editor: Norman Apstein
- Running time: 82 minutes

Original release
- Release: September 1, 2006

The Eden Formula, also known as Tyrannosaurus Wrecks, is a 2006 American science fiction horror film written and directed by John Carl Buechler. It stars Jeff Fahey, Dee Wallace, and Tony Todd. The film includes recycled footage from the Carnosaur films, for which Buechler had provided dinosaur effects.

== Plot ==
Dr. Harrison Parker (Jeff Fahey) is a scientist working at Calgorin Industries who developed the Eden Formula, a chemical that can reproduce organisms and cure various diseases. However, unknown to Parker, deep underground the general area of his industrial district, other Calgorin Industries scientists have created a Tyrannosaurus rex from Parker's formula and keep it locked away in a subterranean location in order to impress stockholders. Soon enough, industry spies enter a laboratory at Calgorin Industries so they can steal the formula and pass it off as their own, making millions of dollars.

The spies, led by James Radcliffe (Tony Todd), accidentally set loose the bloodthirsty tyrannosaur, which breaks its way out of the lab and rampages into the streets of Los Angeles. Parker and his colleague Rhonda Shapton (Dee Wallace) are in the building when the spies attack and now have to secure the formula while trying to evade Radcliffe and his team, all while the T. rex continues adding to its body count.

== Cast ==
- Jeff Fahey as Dr. Harrison Parker
- Dee Wallace as Rhonda Shapton
- Tony Todd as James Radcliffe
- Alexandra Ford as Rebecca Winters
- Stephen Wastell as Eddie
- Elina Madison as Connie
- Miranda Kwok as Kate Lo
- Gregory Gast as Harlon McVicker
- Gregory Abbott Jr. as Samson Webb
- Daniel Anthony as Rockoff
- Robert Axelrod as Wally
- Sarah Elbert as Officer Pattison

== Production and release ==
The film was originally released on DVD in Australia under the name Tyrannosaurus Wrecks. It was written and directed by John Carl Buechler, who also did the dinosaur effects for the Carnosaur films. Dinosaur footage from the Carnosaur films was re-used in Buechler's film. In the U.S., it was released on DVD on March 27, 2007, under the name The Eden Formula.

== Reception ==
Scott Weinberg of DVD Talk called the plot "stupidly simple" and described the film as "an amazingly chintzy retread of Aliens mixed with a little Die Hard". Weinberg wrote that with some more humor, the film "might be mistaken for a parody of monster movies, but it seems pretty clear that the flick is meant to be taken somewhat seriously. And that's just hilarious". Tom Weaver of Starlog described it as a "ripoff" of Die Hard and Jurassic Park.

Fangoria was also critical of the film, including its directing, writing, acting, and dinosaur effects. Jon Condit of Dread Central was amused by the film, writing that it was "not a good movie in any way, shape or form", and that he "couldn't help but be in some way marveled by how unapologetically bad this entire production was". The "Eden Formula" title was also criticized.

== See also ==
- List of films featuring dinosaurs
