= Carnosaur (novel) =

1984 novel by John Brosnan

- Original 1984 paperback edition
- Author: Harry Adam Knight
- Language: English
- Genre: Science fiction & Horror novel
- Publisher: Star Books
- Publication date: 1984
- Publication place: Australia
- Media type: Print (paperback)
- Pages: 208 (first edition, paperback)
- ISBN: 0-352-31447-8 (first edition, paperback)
- OCLC: 12447251

Carnosaur (1984) is a horror novel written by Australian author John Brosnan, under the pseudonym of Harry Adam Knight. A film adaptation was made in 1993 by Adam Simon.

The novel bears several similarities to Michael Crichton's Jurassic Park, though Carnosaur preceded the latter work by six years. Brosnan wrote that he first became interested in writing a novel on dinosaurs in 1983, when a film journalist colleague of his returned from Hollywood and told him that dinosaur films would be an upcoming fad. Brosnan sent his manuscript to Star Books and it was published in 1984. Brosnan was disappointed that the predicted boom in dinosaur films never occurred, and the novel received little attention in the UK. The novel was first published in the United States in 1989 by Bart Books, though with little success.

Brosnan feared that the public would have thought that his Gollancz reissue of Carnosaur would have been seen as a plagiarism to Jurassic Park. He admitted he liked the scene in the Crichton novel film adaptation involving dinosaurs rampaging through a museum, as it bore direct similarities to an incident featured in Carnosaur. Although Brosnan disliked Roger Corman's film adaptation of the novel, he nonetheless credited it with having raised greater awareness of his original story.

== Plot ==
Set in the rural village of Warchester near Cambridgeshire, England, the novel opens at a chicken farm which is attacked one night by a mysterious creature, leaving both the farmer and his wife dead. A story circulates that the killer was a Siberian tiger that had escaped the private zoo of an eccentric lord named Darren Penward. A reporter named David Pascal investigates the carnage, and notices that the blood-stained room where the attack occurred has been thoroughly cleansed in a seeming attempt at covering the killer's footprints. A few days later, the creature attacks a stable, killing a horse, the keeper, and her daughter, leaving one survivor, an eight-year-old boy. Pascal arrives at the scene, only to find Penward's men already there, towing a concealed animal with a helicopter. Pascal interviews the boy, who reveals that the killer was not a tiger, but in fact a dinosaur. After unsuccessfully trying to interview Penward's men, Pascal moves on and begins a sexual relationship with Penward's nymphomaniac wife, who eventually takes him into her private quarters.

From there, Pascal enters the zoo, only to discover that it's filled with dinosaurs. He is captured and given a tour of the establishment. He sees a variety of different species, mostly carnivores, including the dinosaur that had escaped earlier which is identified as a Deinonychus, a sexually frustrated Megalosaurus, and an adolescent Tarbosaurus. Penward explains that he recreated the dinosaurs by studying the DNA fragments found in fossils, then using them as a basis for restructuring the DNA of chickens. He goes as far as saying that he intends to let his dinosaurs loose in remote areas of the world where they could flourish and eventually spread after what he considers an inevitable Third World War. Pascal is imprisoned, only to be rescued by Lady Penward, but only after promising that he permanently commit to her. As they make their escape, Pascal notices that his ex-girlfriend Jenny Stamper, also a reporter, has been caught in the act of infiltrating Penward's zoo as well. Enraged at his insistence on helping her, Lady Penward releases the dinosaurs and other animals present in the zoo. In the chaos, the Tarbosaurus destroys Penward's helicopter and heavy machine gun before it can get in the air. The Deinonychus pursues Pascal and Jenny through Penward's museum, with the two getting away when it is tricked into attacking its own reflection due to perceiving it as a threat much like a bird. The Tarbosaurus, driven by equating the smell of mammals with easy food, further destroys the premise by bashing down numerous fences and gates, chasing the protagonists down before battling a pride of lions. The couple manage to reach Pascal's car and flee the property, with the Tarbosaurus in pursuit down the road. Lord Penward is gored in the leg by an escaped bull (one of several he kept as food for the dinosaurs) and captures his insane wife.

Pascal and Jenny escape to the authorities, but are not believed until the Tarbosaurus catches back up with their car and devours a police officer. All across rural England, reports begin flooding in on mysterious deaths caused by both the prehistoric animals and the modern-day predators Penward kept in his zoo. A plesiosaur is spotted by a bird poacher who is killed by one of Penward's escaped tigers, before also picking off teens aboard a pleasure boat, a Dilophosaurus kills a Member of Parliament after breaking into his rural home, the Megalosaurus gets run over by a lorry whose driver is killed by a panther, an Altispinax attacks a herd of cows before killing the farmer attempting to stop it, and the Tarbosaurus destroys a pub before invading a neighborhood development. The British Army is called, and soon many dinosaurs are killed but at often great loss of life to civilians or soldiers. The Dilophosaurus is shelled, the plesiosaur is bombarded with depth charges, armed helicopters hunt down the Altispinax, a FV101 Scorpion tank kills a Scolosaurus after it destroys another Scorpion, and the Deinonychus is killed in Penward's manor when soldiers storm the facility after it eviscerates a colonel. The Tarbosaurus breaks into an indoor mall and chases Pascal and Jenny though it, before being forced back by a fire hose being shot into its ear. Eventually, the creature is killed when a support pillar causes a roof to collapse on it.

The next day, Pascal goes to visit Jenny at her home, only to find her badly injured, and her family dead, killed by a second Deinonychus which Pascal slays with a pitchfork. Meanwhile, the dying Penward traps his wife inside a farmhouse, where she is eaten alive by two newly hatched Tyrannosaurus rex. At the conclusion of the story, aside from the baby Tyrannosaurus, the only other dinosaur left alive is a baby Brachiosaurus that is to be exhibited at a British zoo.
