= Frank Novak =

American character actor (born 1945)

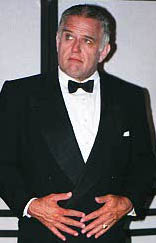
- Novak as a mob boss in A Servant of Two Masters
- Born: March 4, 1945 (age 80); Chicago, Illinois
- Occupation: Actor
- Years active: 1983–present

Frank Novak (born March 4, 1945) is an American character actor who has made dozens of film and television appearances in Independence Day, Newsies, Breast Men, Seinfeld, CSI: Crime Scene Investigation, NYPD Blue, Becker, Charmed, Diagnosis Murder, Party of Five, Monk, and Las Vegas. He gave a memorable performance as General Douglas MacArthur in the miniseries The Korean War made for Chinese television, and played Henry Kissinger in the science fiction epic Watchmen.

== Theatre work ==
Novak has appeared in numerous theatrical productions including A Cat Among Pigeons, as Lenny in Of Mice and Men for the Santa Susanna Repertory Company, the title role in King Lear at the Basement Theater, and as the mob boss Salvadore Lombardi in Jon Mullich's adaptation of A Servant of Two Masters, set in Prohibition-era Chicago.

== Filmography ==
- I Am Joe's Eye (1983)
- Silent Night, Deadly Night Part 2 (1987) - Loan Shark
- Street Soldiers (1991)
- The Killing Mind (1991) – Desk officer
- Newsies (1992) - Policeman
- Sleepwalkers (1992) - Deputy Sheriff
- Body Chemistry II: The Voice of a Stranger (1992) - Mahoney
- Stepmonster (1993) - Fire Captain
- Carnosaur (1993) - Jesse Paloma
- Seinfeld - "The Dinner Party" (1994) - Liquor Store Clerk
- The Force (1994) - Booking Officer
- Watchers III (1994) - Stratten
- Night of the Running Man (1995) - Conductor
- The Nature of the Beast (1995) - Manfred
- Independence Day (1996) - Teddy
- Breast Men (1997) - Earl
- What's Cooking? (2000) - Governor Rhoads
- Shadow Hours (2000) - Husband
- Cahoots (2001) - Charlie
- Rennie's Landing (2001) - Bank Manager
- Role of a Lifetime (2001) - Desk Sergeant
- Scorcher (2002) - City Engineer
- Air Marshal (2003) - General Watkins
- Undercover Kids (2004) - Grandpa
- Rumor Has It... (2005) - Party Guest
- The Fall of Night (2007) - Joe's father
- Necessary Evil (2008) - Army General
- Watchmen (2009) - Henry Kissinger
- Hollywoo (2011) - Vieil homme entrée Palace Hotel
- Area 51 (2015) - Frank Novak
