= Harrison Page =

American television and film actor

- Occupation: Actor
- Years active: 1968–present

Harrison Page is an American television and film actor who has appeared in many popular series, including Sledge Hammer!, Cold Case, JAG, ER, Ally McBeal, Ultraman: The Ultimate Hero, Melrose Place, Quantum Leap, The Wonder Years, 21 Jump Street, Midnight Caller, Murder, She Wrote, Fame, Gimme a Break!, Benson, Hill Street Blues, Webster, The Dukes of Hazzard, Kung Fu, Kojak, Mannix, Soap, Bonanza, and Columbo.

A life member of the Actors Studio, Page is best known for playing the ill-tempered Captain Trunk in the ABC's 1980s police satire Sledge Hammer! He was also a regular on C.P.O. Sharkey, starring Don Rickles. In 1977, Page was taping a scene with Rickles when Johnny Carson (who was recording The Tonight Show just down the hall) suddenly burst in and berated Rickles about breaking Carson's cigarette box—an all-time classic bit of late-night TV history.

Page also appeared in the cult film Beyond the Valley of the Dolls, and alongside Jean-Claude Van Damme in the box-office hit movie Lionheart (1990). In 1993, he appeared in Carnosaur.

== Filmography ==
Year	Title	Role	Notes
1968	Vixen!	Niles	
1970	Beyond the Valley of the Dolls	Emerson Thorne	
1972	Trouble Man	Bogus Cop	
1990	Lionheart	Joshua	
1993	Conflict of Interest	Capt. Garland	
1993	Carnosaur	Sheriff Fowler	
2009	Deadland	Red	
2012	Bad Ass	Klondike	
2016	Watch This	Clifford	Short film
2023	Magazine Dreams	William Lattimore	Released theatrically in 2025
