= John Brosnan =

Australian writer

- Born: John Raymond Brosnan; 7 October 1947; Perth, Western Australia, Australia
- Died: 11 April 2005 (aged 57); South Harrow, London, England
- Occupation: Writer
- Writing career
- Pen name: Harry Adam Knight, Simon Ian Childer, James Blackstone, John Raymond
- Period: 1968-2004
- Genres: Science fiction, fantasy, non-fiction

John Raymond Brosnan (7 October 1947 – 11 April 2005) was an Australian writer of fantasy and science fiction, as well as non-fiction. He was born in Perth, Western Australia, and died in South Harrow, London, from acute pancreatitis.

He sometimes published under the pseudonyms Harry Adam Knight, Simon Ian Childer (both sometimes used together with Leroy Kettle), James Blackstone (used together with John Baxter), and John Raymond. Three movies were based on his novels–Beyond Bedlam (aka Nightscare), Proteus (based on Slimer), and Carnosaur. In addition to science fiction, he also wrote a number of books about cinema and was a regular columnist with the popular UK magazine Starburst and comic 2000 AD.

The University of Liverpool holds a collection of his work consisting of both published material and drafts.

== Bibliography ==
His works include:

=== Science fiction ===
==== Series ====
- Sky Lords series
  - The Sky Lords (1988)
  - The War of the Sky Lords (1989)
  - The Fall of the Sky Lords (1991)
- Damned and Fancy series
  - Damned and Fancy (1995)
  - Have Demon, Will Travel (1996)
- Mothership series
  - Mothership (2004)
  - Mothership Awakening (2005)

==== Novels ====
- As John Brosnan
  - Skyship (1981)
  - The Midas Deep (1983)
  - The Opoponax Invasion (1993)
- As James Blackstone with John Baxter
  - Torched (1986)
- As Harry Adam Knight with Leroy Kettle
  - Slimer (1983)
  - The Fungus (1985) (re-released in 1990 as Death Spore)
  - Bedlam (1992)
- As Simon Ian Childer with Leroy Kettle
  - Tendrils (1986)
- As Harry Adam Knight
  - Carnosaur (1984)
- As Simon Ian Childer
  - Worm (1988)

==== Short stories ====
- Junk Shop (published in SF Digest, 1976)
- Conversation on a Starship in Warp-Drive (1975)
- An Eye in Paradise
- The One and Only Tale from The White Horse

=== TV novelisations ===
- Bulman series (as John Raymond)
  - Thin Ice (1987)
- Prospects series (as John Raymond)
  - Dirty Weekend (1986)
  - Partners in Brine (1986)

=== Humour ===
- The Dirty Movie Book (1988) with Leroy Kettle (as Leroy Mitchell)

=== Non-fiction ===
- James Bond in the Cinema (1972)
- Movie Magic: The Story of Special Effects in the Cinema (1974)
- The Horror People (1976)
- Future Tense: The Cinema of Science Fiction (1978)
- James Bond for Your 007 Eyes Only (1981) (with Tony Crawley)
- The Primal Screen: A History of Science Fiction Film (1991)
- Hollywood Babble On (1998)
- Lights, Camera, Magic! (1998)
- Scream: The Unofficial Guide to the Scream Trilogy (2000)

=== Comics ===
==== 2000 AD ====
- Night Zero (with Kev Hopgood):
  - "Night Zero" (in 2000 AD #607-616, December 1988 - March 1989)
  - "Beyond Zero" (in 2000 AD #630-634, 645-649 and 665-666, June 1989 - February 1990)
  - "Lost in Zero" (in 2000 AD Annual 1991, September 1990)
  - "Below Zero" (in 2000 AD #731-745, May–August 1991)
