= Jerome Bixby =

American writer

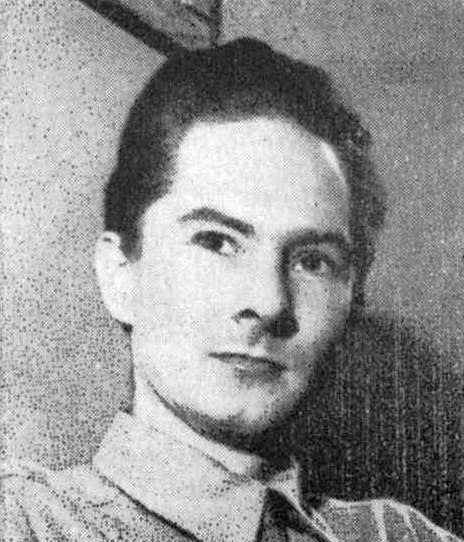
- Jerome Bixby c. 1954
- Born: Drexel Jerome Lewis Bixby; January 11, 1923; Los Angeles, California, United States
- Died: April 28, 1998 (aged 75); San Bernardino, California, United States
- Occupations: Novelist, short story writer
- Spouse: Lin Bixby
- Children: Emerson Bixby; Leonardo Brook Bixby; Russell Albert Ludwig Bixby
- Writing career
- Pen name: D. B. Lewis; Harry Neal; Albert Russell; J. Russell; M. St. Vivant; Thornecliff Herrick; Alger Rome (in collaboration with Algis Budrys)
- Genres: Science fiction, western
- Notable works: "It's a Good Life"; "Mirror, Mirror" (Star Trek screenplay)

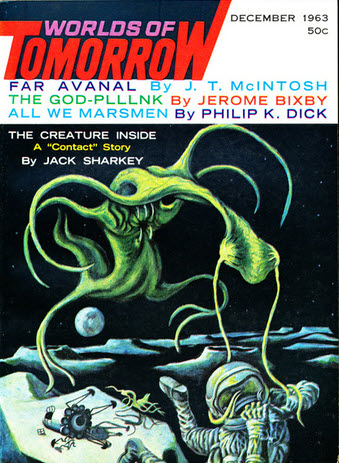
Bixby's "The God-Plllnk" was the cover story of the December 1963 issue of Worlds of Tomorrow.

Drexel Jerome Lewis Bixby (January 11, 1923 – April 28, 1998) was an American short story writer and scriptwriter. He wrote the 1953 story "It's a Good Life", which was included in The Science Fiction Hall of Fame.

"It's a Good Life" was the basis of a 1961 episode of The Twilight Zone and inspired one of the segments in Twilight Zone: The Movie (1983). He wrote four episodes for the Star Trek series: "Mirror, Mirror", "Day of the Dove", "Requiem for Methuselah", and "By Any Other Name". With Otto Klement, he co-wrote the story upon which the science fiction movie Fantastic Voyage (1966) was based. Bixby's final produced work was the screenplay for the 2007 science fiction film The Man from Earth.

He also wrote many westerns and used the pseudonyms Jay Lewis Bixby, D. B. Lewis, Harry Neal, Albert Russell, J. Russell, M. St. Vivant, Thornecliff Herrick, and Alger Rome (for one collaboration with Algis Budrys).

== Life ==
Bixby was born January 11, 1923, in Los Angeles, California, to Rex and Ila (née Lewis) Bixby.

He studied piano and composition at the Juilliard School of Music.

He was the editor of Planet Stories from Summer 1950 to July 1951, Jungle Stories from Fall 1949 to Spring 1951 (a magazine which featured stories of Tarzan-imitation Ki-Gor and, briefly, Sheena, Queen of the Jungle), Action Stories from Fall 1949 to Fall 1950, and founding editor of Two Complete Science-Adventure Books (from Winter 1950 to July 1951) and of Two Western Romances from Summer 1950 to Summer 1951 (by which time it was retitled 2 Western-Action Books). All these titles were published by Fiction House, which also published corresponding comic books for which Bixby also wrote and edited.

His best-known television works include four original Star Trek episodes, including 1967's "Mirror, Mirror", which introduced the franchise's concept of the "Mirror Universe"; and 1969's "Requiem for Methuselah", about Flint, a 6,000-year-old man. He also scripted the episodes "Day of the Dove" and "By Any Other Name".

His short story "It's a Good Life" (1953), adapted as a teleplay for The Twilight Zone by Rod Serling, is arguably his best-known work, in his original prose and in audio/visual adaptations. It was revisited in the 1983 Twilight Zone film, and chosen to be one of the many Twilight Zone episodes parodied by The Simpsons, this one in the Halloween 1991 episode "Treehouse of Horror II".

Bixby conceived and co-wrote the story for the 1966 film Fantastic Voyage. Bantam Books obtained the rights for a paperback novelization based on the screenplay and approached Isaac Asimov to write it.

Jerome Bixby's last work, a screenplay, The Man from Earth, was conceived in the early 1960s and completed on his deathbed in April 1998. In 2007, it was made into an independent motion picture, with his son Emerson Bixby as executive producer, directed by Richard Schenkman, and starring David Lee Smith, William Katt, Richard Riehle, Tony Todd, Annika Peterson, Alexis Thorpe, Ellen Crawford, and John Billingsley.

Bixby wrote the original screenplay for It! The Terror from Beyond Space (1958), which inspired Alien (1979). The Star Trek: Deep Space Nine seventh-season Mirror Universe episode, "The Emperor's New Cloak" (1999), is dedicated to Bixby's memory.

Isaac Asimov described Bixby as "an excellent piano player".

He died on April 28, 1998, in San Bernardino, California, of heart failure, aged 75. He was remembered by Variety as a "Science-fiction writer... whose screen work included 'Fantastic Voyage,' one of the stories for 'Twilight Zone — The Movie' and the original screenplay for the cult classic 'It! The Terror From Beyond Space.'"

== Bibliography ==
=== Collections ===
- Devil's Scrapbook (1964; reprinted as Call for an Exorcist 1974)
- Space by the Tale (1964)
- Mirror Mirror: Classic SF by the Famed Star Trek and Fantastic Voyage Writer (2014)

=== Short stories ===
- "Tubemonkey" (1949)
- "And All for One" (1950)
- "The Crowded Colony" (1950) (as Jay B. Drexel)
- "Cargo to Callisto" (1950) (as Jay B. Drexel)
- "The Whip" (1951) (as Jerome D. Bixby)
- "Vengeance on Mars" (1951) (as D. B. Lewis)
- "Page and Player" (1952) (as Harry Neal)
- "Ev" (1952) with Raymond Z. Gallun
- "Nightride and Sunrise" (1952) with James Blish
- "The Second Ship" (1952)
- "Sort of Like a Flower" (1952)
- "Angels in the Jets" (1952)
- "Zen" (1952)
- "It's a Good Life" (1953), published in The Golden Age of Science Fiction (1981), Kingsley Amis (editor)
- "The Slizzers" (1953)
- "Share Alike" (1953) with Joe E. Dean
- "Can Such Beauty Be?" (1953)
- "The Monster" (1953)
- "Underestimation" (1953) with Algis Budrys (as Alger Rome)
- "Where There's Hope" (1953)
- "One Way Street" (1953)
- "Little Boy" (1954) (as Harry Neal)
- "The Holes Around Mars" (1954)
- "The Good Dog" (1954)
- "Halfway to Hell" (1954)
- "The Draw" (1954)
- "The Young One" (1954)
- "Small War" (1954)
- "Mirror, Mirror" (1954)
- "For Little George" (1954) (as Jay B. Drexel)
- "The Battle of the Bells" (1954)
- "The Murder-Con" (1954)
- "Our Town" (1955)
- "Laboratory" (1955)
- "Trace" (1961)
- "The Magic Typewriter" (1963)
- "The Bad Life" (1963)
- "The God-Plllnk" (1963)
- "The Best Lover in Hell" (1964)
- "Lust in Stone" (1964)
- "Sin Wager" (1964)
- "Kiss of Blood" (1964)
- "The Marquis' Magic Potion" (1964)
- "Natural History of the Kley" (1964)
- "Old Testament" (1964)
- "The Magic Potion" (1976)

=== Photonovels ===
- Day of the Dove (1978)

== Filmography ==
Star Trek episodes

- "Mirror, Mirror" (1967) (writer)
- "By Any Other Name" (1968) (story, teleplay)
- "Day of the Dove" (1968) (writer)
- "Requiem for Methuselah" (1969) (writer)

Men into Space episode

- "Is There Another Civilization?" (1960) (writer)

Twilight Zone stories

- "It's a Good Life" (1961) (short story)
- Third segment ("It's a Good Life"), Twilight Zone: The Movie (1983) (story)
- "It's Still a Good Life" (2002 Series) (based on characters created by)

Films

- Curse of the Faceless Man (1958) (writer)
- It! The Terror from Beyond Space (1958) (writer)
- Rampage (1963) (screen story)
- Fantastic Voyage (1966) (story)
- The Man From Earth (2007) (writer)
- The Man From Earth: Holocene (2018) (based on characters created by)
