= AVH: Alien vs. Hunter =

- Directed by: Scott Harper
- Written by: David Michael Latt
- Produced by: David Michael Latt
- Starring: William Katt; Dedee Pfeiffer
- Cinematography: Mark Atkins
- Edited by: Matthew Alson Thornbury
- Distributed by: The Asylum
- Release date: December 18, 2007
- Running time: 85 minutes
- Country: United States
- Language: English

AVH: Alien vs. Hunter is a 2007 science fiction horror film directed by Scott Harper and starring William Katt and Dedee Pfeiffer. It was produced and distributed by The Asylum and is a "mockbuster" of the 20th Century Fox film Aliens vs. Predator: Requiem. It was released straight to DVD on December 18, 2007, one week before AVPR's theatrical release, and was met with a universally negative response from critics.

== Plot ==
A journalist named Lee Custler (William Katt) is out jogging when a flying object passes behind him and crashes. Sheriff Joel Armstrong (Collin Brock) picks him up and they go to check it out. They find an abandoned caravan close to where the object crashed. As they discover the object and realize it is a spaceship, an Alien emerges. The Alien then chases them, after which Lee flees to the car. However, Armstrong makes a stand, trips, falls and is killed by the Alien that then leaves. A terrified Tammy finds Lee and they call the local authorities but their car is destroyed by the Alien.

They run to a local café where they meet Hilary, Javier, Figgus and Marcy who do not believe them. Together they go back where they find Garrison wounded and the other passenger gone. Garrison says that everyone else died. The Alien then appears and kills Marcy, and while the others flee it fights a cyborg-like Hunter. The group decides to go to Valentine, the local hunter, through the sewers. All except Javier, who is killed by the Alien, make it to Valentine's and his daughter Freckle's house where they call for the support of a local paramilitary team. Valentine attempts to kill the Hunter, only to be nearly killed instead, but he makes it alive.

The group then splits up: Valentine and Lee go to meet the paramilitary force while Tammy, Hillary, Freckles, Garrison and Figgus try to escape through a set of tunnels. Garrison gets lost in the tunnels and killed by the Alien but the others make it to the hunter’s ship to their dismay. There they find a second Alien that's nearly dead and figure out that to get rid of the Hunter they need to kill the Alien and take a ray gun from the ship. Lee and Valentine find Two Fingers, Marty and Styles, the paramilitary force, and go to find T and Lexin who are in the woods. But they are already dead and the Hunter kills Marty, and kicks Styles away flying right near the Alien who kills both him and Valentine, who tries to save him.

The few survivors meet and while they try to think of a strategy, Figgus is impaled on a branch and dies. Two Fingers tries to kill the Hunter, who kills both him and Freckles. But just as he is going to kill Hillary, Lee uses the ray gun on the Alien, who nearly killed him a few seconds before, and makes him explode on a giant fireball, which kills him. As the three remaining survivors (Lee, Hilary, and Tammy) head back to town, the Hunter, back on his ship, takes off his mask revealing that he is a human from Earth and this is a similar planet but not the same. The film ends as he comments on the possibility of a second hunt.

== Cast ==
- William Katt as Lee
- Dedee Pfeiffer as Hilary
- Wittly Jourdan as Tammy
- Randy Mulkey as Valentine
- Jennifer Couch as Freckles
- Jason S. Gray as Garrison
- John Murphy Jr. as Figgus
- Kevin Kazakoff as "Two Fingers"
- Philip Bak as Javier
- Josh Tessier as Styles
- Matthew Bolton as Marty
- Collin Brock as Sheriff Joel Armstrong
- Darbi Gwynn as Marcy
- Aaron Council as The Alien
- Rob Filson as The Hunter
- Josh Hornig as Man Planting Flowers

== Reception ==
Scott Foy of Dread Central rated it 0.5/5 stars and called it "neither fun nor exciting nor scary nor even so bad it’s good". Foy said that insiders at The Asylum had written to him, blaming Harper for the film's problems. Writing about films that feature hunting as their primary theme, author Bryan Senn called it "utterly dismal in every respect".

== See also ==
- Aliens vs. Avatars
- Alien Origin, another Asylum mockbuster of the Alien series
- Alien 2: On Earth, an unauthorized sequel to Alien
