= Jungle Stories =

Jungle Stories may refer to:

- Jungle Stories, a version of the book Man-Eaters of Kumaon, by Jim Corbett
- Jungle Stories (magazine), an American pulp magazine published from 1938 to 1954
