= Mischief Night (2013 film) =

- Release poster
- Directed by: Richard Schenkman
- Written by: Richard Schenkman; Jesse Baget; Eric D. Wilkinson
- Produced by: Jesse Baget; Richard Schenkman; Eric D. Wilkinson
- Starring: Ian Bamberg; Noell Coet; Adam C. Edwards; Stephanie Erb; Daniel Hugh Kelly; Erica Leerhsen
- Cinematography: Richard J. Vialet
- Edited by: Ana Florit
- Music by: Anastasia Devana
- Production companies: Mischief Night; Ruthless Pictures
- Distributed by: Image Entertainment
- Release date: October 30, 2013
- Running time: 87 minutes
- Country: United States
- Language: English

Mischief Night is a 2013 American horror film written and directed by Richard Schenkman. It focuses on a young girl with psychosomatic blindness being terrorized by a hooded killer.

== Plot ==
Emily Walton is a young woman with psychosomatic blindness caused by a car accident that killed her mother. Emily is trying to adjust to her blindness and at the same time is being smothered by her father. On Mischief Night, when her father goes out on a date leaving her alone, she is terrorized by a hooded figure. Emily must fight for her life in order to survive and protect herself and everyone she holds dear from the intruder.

== Cast ==
- Noell Coet as Emily Walton
- Ian Bamberg as Jimmy
- Daniel Hugh Kelly as David Walton
- Stephanie Erb as Lauren
- Erica Leerhsen as Kim
- Charlie O'Connell as Will
- Adam C. Edwards as The Intruder
- Stephen Rhodes as Second Intruder
- Shannon Makhanian as Emily Walton's Mother
- Richard Riehle as Truck Driver
- Ally Walker as Dr. Pomock

== Production ==
"It's been a mad dash, but we've made it across the finish line and Mischief Night is finished. I could not be more pleased with how it all came together. It looks great and sounds great. The score by Anastasia Devana is powerful and evocative, Richard Vialet's photography is beautiful, and the entire cast gave it everything they had. I think we've made a film which not only will please genre fans, but also a more general audience."

— Writer/director Richard Schenkman on the film's production

Mischief Night was written and directed by Richard Schenkman, from a story idea by Eric Wilkinson and Jesse Baget. Development for the film began in 2007 after the release of The Man From Earth, which Schenkman produced. Baget and Wilkinson had both grown up in New Jersey where Mischief Night was "celebrated" by the two filmmakers, according to Schenkmen " with real vigour". Lifelong fans of the horror genre, Baget and Wilkinson developed a scenario for a horror film centered around the holiday, which they subsequently pitched to Image Entertainment. After successfully pitching the film to Image, Baget then worked on the film's screenplay, with the intention of directing the film himself. Baget, however, was forced to drop out due to scheduling conflicts with other projects. Instead, the filmmakers approached Schenkman with an offer to direct the film, as the group had become close friends after their work together on The Man From Earth. Baget's initial screenplay contained many of the film's action and key plot points, including Emily's blindness, which was carried into the film's final draft.

=== Casting and filming ===
For the role of the film's main protagonist Emily Walton, extensive auditions were done to find the right actress for the role, "it had to be somebody young, somebody whom the audience would believe was only 17. She also had to be able to be convincingly blind, somebody who could find the humor in the role, somebody funny & charming because it certainly wasn't all screaming and crying" as Schankman later stated in an interview. The role later went to Noell Coet, who had previously starred in minor roles before being cast in the film. Coet did extensive research on blindness in preparation for the role. Stephanie Erb and Richard Riehle, both of whom Schenkmen had previously worked with, were later cast for the roles of Aunt Lauren, and Trucker respectively.

== Release ==
Mischief Night was released on DVD by Image Entertainment on December 17, 2013. The film also had a limited theatrical release at the same time.

=== Critical response ===
Jamie S. Rich from The Oregonian gave the film a positive review stating, "It works fairly well, and Mischief Night should make for a pretty good pregame show the night before Halloween". Felix Vasquez Jr. from Cinema Crazed.com stated in his review on the film, "Surely it won't win awards for originality, but it takes a pretty old idea and transforms it in to a very entertaining stalk and slash horror film worth watching". Alan Spencer from Cinesploitation.com gave the film a positive review stating, "Mischief Night is based more on execution and suspense rather than bloodletting. If you've seen them all, I say give this one a try. It stands out against the current standard slasher tripe".

Eric Havens from Downright Creepy.com called the film "shallow and superficial". Havens concluded his review by writing, "What could have been a fleshed out story of a girl dealing with grief and guilt becomes nothing but a scream session filled with vague intentions and no real resolution. While this fits in fine with the theory of horror film as symbolic sacrifice, it does little to make Mischief Night a good film." Brad McHargue from Dread Central gave the film a score of 2.5 out of 5, calling it "a The Strangers rehash, replete with similar motives and set-ups". McHargue also criticized the film's uninspired direction, slow pacing, and performances, which he called "a mixed bag". Patrick Cooper from Bloody Disgusting offered similar criticism, stating that the film was "too bogged down by its disjointed pacing and narrative to really hit the mark."

== See also ==
- List of films featuring home invasions
