= Barbara Hale =

American actress (1922–2017)

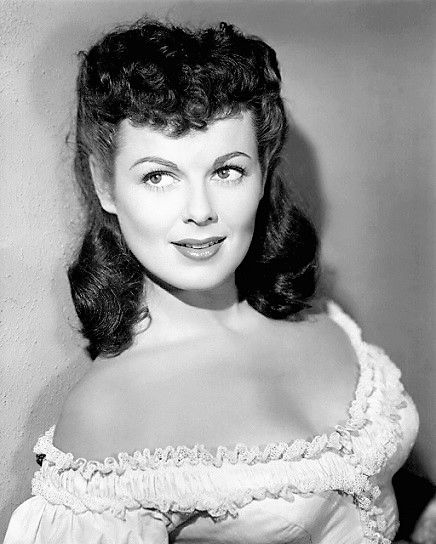
- Hale in 1953
- Born: April 18, 1922; DeKalb, Illinois, U.S.
- Died: January 26, 2017 (aged 94); Sherman Oaks, California, U.S.
- Occupation: Actress
- Years active: 1943–2000
- Known for: Perry Mason
- Spouse: Bill Williams (m. 1946; died 1992)
- Children: 3, including William Katt

Barbara Hale (April 18, 1922 – January 26, 2017) was an American actress who portrayed legal secretary Della Street in the dramatic television series Perry Mason (1957–1966), earning her a 1959 Emmy Award for Outstanding Supporting Actress in a Drama Series. She reprised the role in 30 Perry Mason made-for-television movies (1985–1995).

== Early life ==
Barbara Hale was born in DeKalb, Illinois, to Wilma (née Colvin) and Luther Ezra Hale, a landscape gardener. She had one sister, Juanita, for whom Hale's younger daughter was named. The family was of Scottish and Irish ancestry. In 1940, Hale was a member of the final graduating class from Rockford High School in Rockford, Illinois. She then attended the Chicago Academy of Fine Arts, planning to be an artist. Her performing career began in Chicago, when she started modeling to pay for her education.

== Career ==
=== Film ===
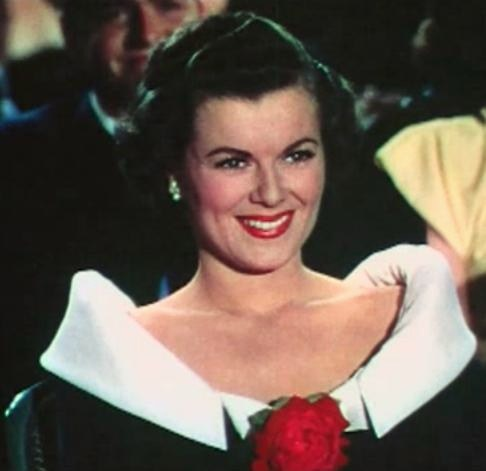
Hale in Jolson Sings Again (1949)

Hale moved to Hollywood in 1943, and under contract to RKO Radio Pictures, made her first screen appearance (uncredited) in Gildersleeve's Bad Day. She continued to make small, uncredited appearances in films, until her first credited role as a glamorous debutante alongside Frank Sinatra in Higher and Higher (1943) (even singing with him in the film). Hale had leading roles in RKO features including West of the Pecos (1945) with Robert Mitchum in his second star vehicle, Lady Luck (1946) — opposite Robert Young in what she described as her first "full stardom" and "her fifth A picture" — and The Window (1949).

Hale left RKO in 1949 and was signed by Columbia Pictures. She received excellent notices for her co-starring performance opposite Larry Parks in the musical biography Jolson Sings Again (1949). She and Parks were teamed for subsequent films.

Hale's run of successful movies continued during the 1950s: the adventure Lorna Doone (1951); the comedy The Jackpot (with James Stewart) (also 1951); the drama A Lion Is in the Streets (1953) with James Cagney, and the Westerns Seminole (also 1953) and The Oklahoman (1957). The latter film, co-starring Joel McCrea, would mark Hale's last leading role in a motion picture.

She seldom appeared in motion pictures thereafter, but was part of an all-star cast in the 1970 movie Airport, playing the wife of an airline pilot (played by Dean Martin). Hale's final appearance in a feature film was in the 1978 drama Big Wednesday as Mrs. Barlow, the mother of the character played by Hale's real-life son William Katt.

=== Television ===
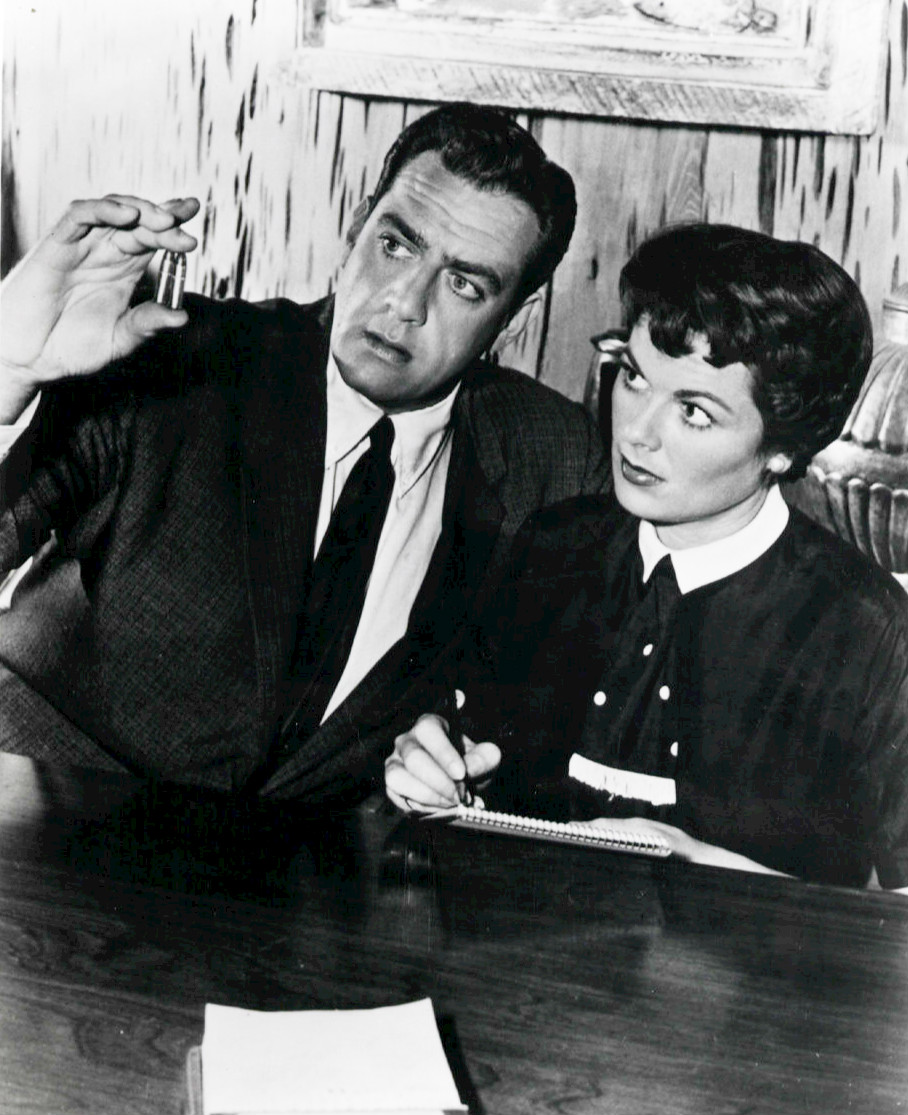
Hale and Raymond Burr in the CBS-TV series Perry Mason (1958)

Hale was considering retirement from acting when she accepted her best known role, as legal secretary Della Street in the television series Perry Mason, starring Raymond Burr as the titular character. The show ran for nine seasons from 1957 to 1966, with 271 episodes produced. The role won Hale a Primetime Emmy Award for Outstanding Supporting Actress in a Drama Series.

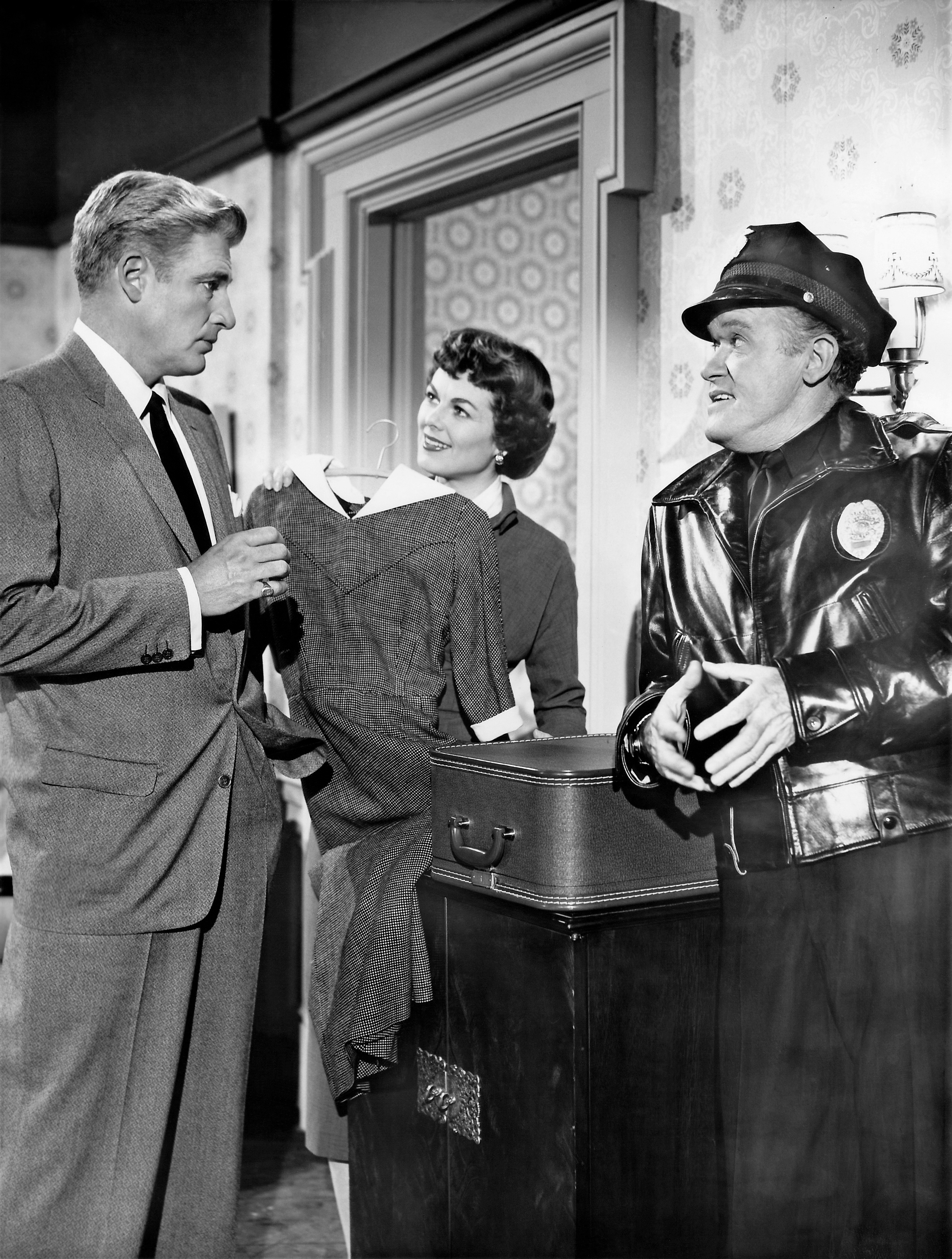
Hale with William Hopper (left) and Frank Sully in Perry Mason (1958)

In 1985, Hale and Burr (by then the only surviving cast members from the original series) reprised their roles for the TV movie Perry Mason Returns. The film was such a ratings hit that a further 29 movies were produced until 1995. Hale continued her role as Della in the four telefilms produced after Burr's death in 1993, subtitled A Perry Mason Mystery (and starring Paul Sorvino as Anthony Caruso in the first film and Hal Holbrook as "Wild" Bill McKenzie in the remaining three). Hale is thus the only actor to be featured in all 30 films.

Hale's son William Katt played detective Paul Drake, Jr., alongside Hale in nine of the Perry Mason TV movies from 1985 to 1988. Hale in turn guest-starred on Katt's series, The Greatest American Hero in which Katt played the title role, aka Ralph Hinkley; Hale played Hinkley's mother in the 1982 episode, "Who's Woo in America". She also played his mother in the 1978 movie Big Wednesday.

Hale guest-starred in "Murder Impromptu", a 1971 episode of Ironside, Burr's first post-Perry Mason series.

Her last on-screen appearance was a TV biographical documentary about Burr that aired in 2000.

=== Radio ===
Hale's activity in radio was limited; she appeared in one episode each of Voice of the Army (1947), Lux Radio Theatre (1950), and Proudly We Hail (syndicated), as well as five episodes of Family Theater (1950–1954).

== Spokeswoman ==
When the Amana Corporation wanted a spokeswoman for its new Radarange microwave ovens, Hale was selected, her friendly personality already familiar to millions of women viewers. In each of Hale's TV commercials, most of which aired in the 1970s, she would mention the company's slogan: "If it doesn't say Amana, it's not a Radarange."

== Personal life ==
In 1945, during the filming of West of the Pecos, Hale met actor Bill Williams (birth name Herman August Wilhelm Katt). They were married on June 22, 1946. The couple had two daughters, Jodi and Juanita, and a son, actor William Katt.

Hale became a follower of the Baháʼí Faith.

== Death ==
Hale died at her home in Sherman Oaks, California, on January 26, 2017, at age 94 of complications from chronic obstructive pulmonary disease. She was the last surviving original Perry Mason cast member.

== Accolades ==
Hale was recognized as a Star of Television (with a marker at 1628 Vine Street) on the Hollywood Walk of Fame on February 8, 1960. She won the Emmy Award for Best Supporting Actress (Continuing Character) in a Dramatic Series in 1959 and was nominated for the Emmy for Outstanding Performance in a Supporting Role by an Actor or Actress in a Series in 1961.

She was presented one of the Golden Boot Awards in 2001 for her contributions to western cinema.

== Filmography ==
=== Films ===
Year	Title	Role	Notes
1943	Gildersleeve's Bad Day	Girl at Party Getting Peavey to Donate	Film debut; Uncredited
1943	Mexican Spitfire's Blessed Event	Girl at Airport	Uncredited
1943	The Seventh Victim	Subway Passenger	Uncredited
1943	The Iron Major	Sarah Cavanaugh	Uncredited
1943	Gildersleeve on Broadway	Stocking Salesgirl	Uncredited
1943	Government Girl	Girl in Hotel Lobby	Uncredited
1943	Around the World	Barbara Hale	Uncredited
1943	Higher and Higher	Katherine Keating	
1944	Prunes and Politics		Short
1944	The Falcon Out West	Marion Colby	
1944	Goin' To Town	Patty	
1944	Heavenly Days	Angie	
1944	The Falcon in Hollywood	Peggy Callahan	
1945	West of the Pecos	Rill Lambeth	
1945	First Yank into Tokyo	Abby Drake	
1946	Lady Luck	Mary Audrey	
1947	A Likely Story	Vickie North	
1948	The Boy with Green Hair	Miss Brand	
1949	The Clay Pigeon	Martha Gregory	
1949	The Window	Mrs. Mary Woodry	
1949	Jolson Sings Again	Ellen Clark	
1949	And Baby Makes Three	Jacqueline 'Jackie' Walsh	
1950	The Jackpot	Amy Lawrence	
1950	Emergency Wedding	Dr. Helen Hunt	
1951	Lorna Doone	Lorna Doone	
1952	The First Time	Betsey Bennet	
1952	Rainbow 'Round My Shoulder	Barbara Hale	Uncredited
1953	Last of the Comanches	Julia Lanning	
1953	Seminole	Revere Muldoon	
1953	The Lone Hand	Sarah Jane Skaggs	
1953	A Lion Is in the Streets	Verity Wade	
1955	Unchained	Mary Davitt	
1955	The Far Horizons	Julia Hancock	
1956	The Houston Story	Zoe Crane	
1956	7th Cavalry	Martha Kellogg	
1957	The Oklahoman	Anne Barnes	
1957	Slim Carter	Allie Hanneman	
1958	Desert Hell	Celie Edwards	
1968	Buckskin	Sarah Cody	
1970	Airport	Sarah Demerest	
1970	The Red, White and Black	Mrs. Alice Grierson	
1975	The Giant Spider Invasion	Dr. Jenny Langer	
1978	Big Wednesday	Mrs. Barlow	Final film role

=== Television ===
Year	Title	Role	Notes
1952–56	The Ford Television Theatre	Marta Linden, Nora White	Episodes: "The Divided Heart", "Remember to Live", "Behind the Mask"
1953	Footlights Theater	Katherine Charles	Episode: "Change of Heart"
1953–55	Schlitz Playhouse of Stars		Episodes: "Vacation for Ginny", "Tourists-Overnight"
1955	Studio 57	Ruth	Episode: "Young Couples Only"
1955	General Electric Theater	Ellen Newman	Episode: "The Windmill"
1955	Screen Director's Playhouse	June Waters	Episode: "Meet the Governor"
1955	Celebrity Playhouse		Episode: "He Knew All About Women"
1955	Climax!	Mamie Eunson	Episode: "The Day They Gave Babies Away"
1955	Science Fiction Theatre	Nancy Stanton, Pat Hastings	Episodes: "Conversations With an Ape", "The Hastings Secret"
1956	The Loretta Young Show	Bill's Wife	Episode: "The Challenge"
1956	Damon Runyon Theater	Wendy Longfield	Episode: "The Good Luck Kid"
1956	Crossroads	Jane Sherman	Episode: "Lifeline"
1956	The Millionaire	Kathy Munson and Marian Munson	Episode: "The Kathy Munson Story"
1956–57	Playhouse 90	Mrs. Julia Wiley, Ann Barnes, Allie Hanneman	Episodes: "The Country Husband", "The Blackwell Story"
1957–66	Perry Mason	Della Street	Credited in all 271 episodes Primetime Emmy Award for Outstanding Supporting Actress in a Drama Series (1959); Nominated—Primetime Emmy Award for Outstanding Supporting Actress in a Drama Series (1961)
1959	General Electric Theater	Lorraine	Episode: "Night Club"
1960	Here's Hollywood	Herself	
1963	Stump the Stars	Herself	2 episodes
1967	Custer	Melinda Terry	Episode: "Death Hunt"
1969	Insight	Mom	Episode: "A Thousand Red Flowers"
1969	Lassie	Sarah Caldwell	Episode: "Lassie and the Water Bottles"
1970	The Most Deadly Game		Episode: "Model for Murder"
1971	Ironside	Marsha Connell	Episode: "Murder Impromptu"
1971	Adam-12	Bonnie Jessup	Episode: "Pick-up"; Hale's husband Bill Williams also appears
1972	The Doris Day Show	Thelma King	Episode: "Doris' House Guest"
1973–78	Walt Disney's Wonderful World of Color	Mrs. Belle Kincaid, Mrs. Hanson, Mrs. Ogle, Mrs. Barlow	Episodes: "Chester, Yesterday's Horse", "Flight of the Grey Wolf, Parts 1 and 2", "The Young Runaways", "Big Wednesday"
1974	Marcus Welby, M.D.	Marjorie	Episode: "The Faith of Childish Things"
1976	Dinah!	Herself	
1982	The Greatest American Hero	Paula Hinkley	Episode: "Who's Woo in America"
1985	Perry Mason Returns	Della Street	Perry Mason TV movie
1986	The Case of the Notorious Nun	Della Street	Perry Mason TV movie
1986	The Case of the Shooting Star	Della Street	Perry Mason TV movie
1987	The Case of the Lost Love	Della Street	Perry Mason TV movie
1987	The Case of the Sinister Spirit	Della Street	Perry Mason TV movie
1987	The Case of the Murdered Madam	Della Street	Perry Mason TV movie
1987	The Case of the Scandalous Scoundrel	Della Street	Perry Mason TV movie
1988	The Case of the Avenging Ace	Della Street	Perry Mason TV movie
1988	The Case of the Lady in the Lake	Della Street	Perry Mason TV movie
1989	The Case of the Lethal Lesson	Della Street	Perry Mason TV movie
1989	The Case of the Musical Murder	Della Street	Perry Mason TV movie
1989	The Case of the All-Star Assassin	Della Street	Perry Mason TV movie
1990	The Case of the Poisoned Pen	Della Street	Perry Mason TV movie
1990	The Case of the Desperate Deception	Della Street	Perry Mason TV movie
1990	The Case of the Silenced Singer	Della Street	Perry Mason TV movie
1990	The Case of the Defiant Daughter	Della Street	Perry Mason TV movie
1991	The Case of the Ruthless Reporter	Della Street	Perry Mason TV movie
1991	The Case of the Maligned Mobster	Della Street	Perry Mason TV movie
1991	The Case of the Glass Coffin	Della Street	Perry Mason TV movie
1991	The Case of the Fatal Fashion	Della Street	Perry Mason TV movie
1992	The Case of the Fatal Framing	Della Street	Perry Mason TV movie
1992	The Case of the Reckless Romeo	Della Street	Perry Mason TV movie
1992	The Case of the Heartbroken Bride	Della Street	Perry Mason TV movie
1993	The Case of the Skin-Deep Scandal	Della Street	Perry Mason TV movie
1993	The Case of the Telltale Talk Show Host	Della Street	Perry Mason TV movie
1993	The Case of the Killer Kiss	Della Street	Perry Mason TV movie
1993	The Case of the Wicked Wives	Della Street	A Perry Mason Mystery TV movie
1994	The Case of the Lethal Lifestyle	Della Street	A Perry Mason Mystery TV movie
1994	The Case of the Grimacing Governor	Della Street	A Perry Mason Mystery TV movie
1995	The Case of the Jealous Jokester	Della Street	A Perry Mason Mystery TV movie
2000	Biography	Herself	Episode: "Raymond Burr, The Case of the TV Legend"
