= Noell Coet =

American actress

- Occupation: Actress
- Years active: 2006–2017

Noell Coet is an American actress. Up until her appearance in The Kings of Appletown, she worked as Noell Felmly.

== Filmography ==
=== Film ===
Year	Title	Role	Notes
2006	Hidden Places	Madison	Short film
2008	Adventures in Appletown	Betsy's Party Friend	Video
2008	Who Do You Love?	Frances	
2009	Luna	Luna (voice)	Short film
2011	5 Time Champion	Shiley	
2011	Inside Out	Isabella Morgan	Short film
2012	Cowgirls 'n Angels	Nora	
2013	Revelation Road: The Beginning of the End	Beth	
2013	Revelation Road 2: The Sea of Glass and Fire	Beth	
2013	Mischief Night	Emily	
2013	Brother's Keeper	Ginny Wonders	
2014	Within the Dark	Nikki Collins	
2014	Pages Great and Grand Escape	The Girl	Short film
2015	Ice Scream	Alice	Post-production

=== Television ===
Year	Title	Role	Notes
2012	Runaways	Keesha Washington	TV series
2013	Longmire	Lucy Samms	Episode: "Party's Over"
2013	CSI: Crime Scene Investigation	Amy Morse	Episode: "Helpless"
2015	Switched at Birth	Erin	Episode: "The Player's Choice"
