= Big Wednesday =

1978 film directed by John Milius

- Theatrical release poster
- Directed by: John Milius
- Written by: John Milius; Dennis Aaberg
- Produced by: Buzz Feitshans
- Starring: Jan-Michael Vincent; William Katt; Gary Busey; Patti D'Arbanville; Lee Purcell
- Cinematography: Bruce Surtees
- Edited by: C. Timothy O'Meara; Robert L. Wolfe
- Music by: Basil Poledouris
- Production company: A-Team Productions
- Distributed by: Warner Bros. Pictures
- Release date: May 26, 1978 (United States)
- Running time: 120 minutes
- Country: United States
- Language: English
- Budget: $11,000,000
- Box office: $4.5 million

Big Wednesday is a 1978 American epic coming of age buddy sports comedy-drama film directed by John Milius. Written by Milius and Dennis Aaberg, it is loosely based on their own experiences at Malibu, California. The picture stars Jan-Michael Vincent, William Katt, and Gary Busey as California surfers facing life and the Vietnam War against the backdrop of their love of surfing.

Raised in Southern California, Milius made Big Wednesday as an homage to the time he spent in Malibu during his youth. Milius and his friends George Lucas and Steven Spielberg famously agreed to exchange a percentage point of Big Wednesday, Star Wars and Close Encounters of the Third Kind prior to the release of the three films throughout 1977–1978. Spielberg in particular was certain that Big Wednesday was going to be a box office hit, opining it was like "American Graffiti meets Jaws", two of the decade's most successful films.

== Plot ==
The film tells the story of three young friends whose passion in life is surfing. The friends include Matt Johnson, a self-destructive type who has a devil-may-care attitude; Jack Barlow, the calm and responsible one of the bunch; and Leroy "The Masochist" Smith, whose nickname tells a lot about his personality.

Their surfing lives are traced from the summer of 1962 to their attempts at dodging the Vietnam War draft in 1965 (including faking insanity, homosexuality, and all manner of medical ailments), and to the end of their innocence in 1968 when one of their friends is killed in Vietnam. The three make the difficult transition to adulthood with parties, surf trips, marriage, and the war.

The friends reunite years later, after Barlow has served in Vietnam, for the "Great Swell of '74". With this reunion, the transition in their lives becomes the end point of what the 1960s meant to so many as they see that the times have changed, and what was a time of innocence is gone forever.

== Cast ==
- Jan-Michael Vincent as Matt Johnson
- William Katt as Jack Barlow
- Gary Busey as Leroy Smith
- Patti D'Arbanville as Sally
- Lee Purcell as Peggy Gordon
- Sam Melville as "Bear"
- Darrell Fetty as "Waxer"
- Robert Englund as "Fly"
- Barbara Hale as Mrs. Barlow
- Fran Ryan as Lucy
- Reb Brown as "Enforcer"
- Joe Spinell as Psychologist
- Gray Frederickson as Doctor

In addition, two-time Pipeline Masters champion Gerry Lopez, who served as one of the six surfing masters in the production of the film, also appears in a cameo as himself during the final surfing section of the film.

== Production ==
=== Script ===
Milius wrote the script with his friend and fellow surfer, journalist Denny Aaberg. It was inspired by a short story Aaberg had published in a 1974 Surfer Magazine entitled "No Pants Mance", and published by Australian surfing magazine Tracks in April 1973 and the lives of a group of friends who used to surf with Aaberg and Milius including Lance Carson.

In writing the script Milius and Aaberg interviewed a lot of their friends from the 1960s. "It was a special time," said Aaberg of the 1960s. "Surfing was a brand new sport with its own aristocracy."

Aaberg says "it took about a year to write" the script. "We very much want it to be authentic. That's important to me because I'm a real surfer. So's John."

"A lot of things [in the film] happened to me," said Milius. "A lot of the characters are me and in another sense none of them are me. It took an awful long time to write the script. It is so very personal. It's about growing up and relationships and the surf is the exotic background. We all knew it was special, we knew it wouldn't last. And we knew how good we had it. Surfing is a strange thing. A lot of people never leave it. You always feel you owe it something. It was a central experience in our lives. It's all changed now."

Milius described the film in a 1976 interview:

It's a surfing HOW GREEN WAS MY VALLEY: the loss of an aristocracy, the end of an era, the passing of a more innocent time to a more corrupt and complex one-all growing up is the passing of innocence. It's based on the lives of three friends ten years ago. It's about their friendship, and the value of friendship. I don't think that kids today have the same kind of values that these people had then; I don't see movies being made about that kind of thing. This movie is about friendship: surfing is just the background. It's about love of a place, love of a time, love of your human contacts, and the loss of those things. It's the most personal film I'll probably ever make, and I figured I ought to do it now, before I get too far away from it. At least half the people who participated are dead now. The attrition rate among surfers is very high. A lot of them died in Vietnam and OD'd on dope.

"Because I surfed, I'm the only director in the world who could have made his picture," said Milius. "And I can tell you, it's so hard, no one will ever make it again."

=== Financing ===
Milius and producer Feitshans had met at American International Pictures, where they worked on Dillinger (1973). They formed their own company, The A Team. This was their first production.

They obtained finance from Warner Bros. Pictures in June 1976. In August Milius announced Big Wednesday would be postponed because the script was not ready and he would instead make Extreme Prejudice. "I've been working on Big Wednesday a long time," Milius said. "I don't want to put it off any further but I don't want to work on it until its ready either."

However, Milius changed his mind again. "John has fallen in love and is getting married and that's opened up this other side of him," said star William Katt in October 1977. "He was going to do another gun and guts macho fight film but he decided to do this; he decided he needed this in his life."

Milius later recalled:

When I did Big Wednesday my first impressions were that I was going to do this coming-of-age story with Arthurian overtones about surfers that nobody took seriously, their troubled lives made larger than life by their experience with the sea. And that's what the movie is. It never strayed from that. There was a lot of pressure to make it more like Animal House, but the movie has a huge following now because it did have loftier ambitions. It wasn't just a story about somebody trying to ride the biggest wave or something. That's not enough.

=== Casting ===
The leads were played by Jan Michael Vincent, Gary Busey and William Katt. "It was the most personal film I'd done," said Katt. "I'd lived that life since I was ten."

Milius at one stage intended to play the role of the Bear himself. "But I couldn't," he said. "The part is simply too big for me to do."

Barbara Hale, mother of William Katt, plays a small role in the film. A 1940s film star but best known as Della Street from the long-running Perry Mason television series, this was Hale's last appearance in a feature film.

=== Filming locations ===
The surfing scenes used in the finale to Big Wednesday were not filmed in California, where the film is set, but at Sunset Beach in Pupukea, Hawaii.

Other filming locations included El Paso, Texas; Hollister Ranch near Santa Barbara; Surfrider Beach (in Malibu); Ventura, California; and La Libertad, El Salvador.

"What I've got to watch out for is getting lost in the surf again," said Milius during filming. "It's so alluring, so easy to get lost in. I worry I might lose sight of the characters. Unlike any other film that has been made about surfing, in this one the characters and not the waves are the most important."

Anthea Sylbert was an executive at Warners at the time. She later called the film "a classic example of an egomaniacal insane man going over budget and not listening to anyone. I mean, they were all just waiting for the Big Wave. Give me a break!"

== Bear Surfboard Brand ==
Milius invented the Bear brand of surfboard as a fictional brand to be used in the movie, and even had surfboards made and arranged for a Californian designer to create a logo. The logo, a red diamond with a bear in it, features prominently throughout the movie, on shop windows, T-shirts, car windows and on surfboards. The first boards were shaped in 1977, by famous board shaper Bill Hamilton. The international distribution of the movie promoted the Bear label worldwide, with people wanting boards with the bear logo. The brand morphed into an actual successful company after the release of the movie, producing hundreds of boards, and is still active today, with various people producing Bear-branded boards in different countries.

== Release ==
The film premiered in wide release in the United States on May 26, 1978.

The picture was screened at various film festivals, including: the Davao City Film Festival, Philippines; the Turin Film Festival, Italy; and others.

A 20th Anniversary screening (which included cast and crewmembers) took place at the Newport Film Festival in 1998.

== Reception ==
=== Box office ===
Big Wednesday was a box office flop upon its release, and was quickly pulled from theatres after taking in only $4.5 million. William Katt explained in a 1979 interview with Roger Ebert a year after the film's release that he believed the movie's failure was due to the marketing focusing only on the fight scenes and surfing angle.

=== Critical response ===
Janet Maslin, film critic for The New York Times, did not like the performances of the actors and wrote, "The surprise is not that Mr. Milius has made such a resoundingly awful film, but rather that he's made a bland one...the movie often seems even more uneventful than material like this need make it, and Mr. Milius's attention to his actors focuses more closely on their pectorals than on their performances. He encourages such stiffness in his players that Barbara Hale, for instance, is quite unconvincing as Mr. Katt's mother. This is a faux pas of no mean eminence; after all, Miss Hale actually is Mr. Katt's mother."

The staff at Variety wrote, "A rubber stamp wouldn't do for John Milius. So he took a sledgehammer and pounded Important all over Big Wednesday. This film about three Malibu surfers in the 1960s has been branded major statement and it's got Big Ideas about adolescence, friendship and the 1960s."

The review aggregator Rotten Tomatoes reports a 67% approval rating, based on 12 reviews, with a weighted average of 6.50/10. Metacritic, which uses a weighted average, assigned the film a score of 54 out of 100, based on 8 critics, indicating "mixed or average" reviews.

Milius later said the film was "sort of a numb spot in my life. It was a very personal film and it really tore me up when it was attacked in such a way that no one saw it."

Quentin Tarantino later wrote that while he preferred "Milius's directorial debut Dillinger, it's hard to argue against the idea that his surfer epic Big Wednesday isn't his classic... Except for Big Wednesday, none of the Milius-directed films have a satisfying conclusion. And the climactic showdown between the heroic trio and the monster waves is so good it makes up for the rest (the trio's Wild Bunch-inspired walk to destiny is by far Milius's finest cinematic moment)... More than any other movie Milius directed, Big Wednesday contains the joy of filmmaking (he waited his whole career to make this movie). It also illustrates the problems with many of his other movies. Which by contrast seem to contain the frustration of filmmaking."

=== References in other cultural forms ===
- Dialogue of the film was used in Anderson .Paak's "The Season / Carry Me" and "Your Prime" on the album Malibu.
- The plot of season 2 episode 13 of Pokémon "The Pi Kahuna" is a reference to this film.
- A character in 2004 Norwegian movie Monstertorsdag, released as Monster Thursday for English-speaking audiences, is a surfer who rides a big wave.
- Nickelodeon cartoon series Rocket Power, whose protagonists are four young surfers, has an episode named "Big Thursday".

=== Accolades ===
Nominations

- Awards of the Japanese Academy: Award of the Japanese Academy Best Foreign Language Film; 1980.

== See also ==
- List of cult films
