= Who Do You Love? (film) =

- Directed by: Jerry Zaks
- Written by: Peter Martin Wortmann; Robert Conte
- Produced by: Les Alexander; Andrea Baynes; Jonathan Mitchell
- Starring: Jon Abrahams; Alessandro Nivola; David Oyelowo; Marika Dominczyk; Tendal Mann
- Cinematography: David Franco
- Edited by: Scott Richter
- Music by: Jeff Beal
- Release dates: September 11, 2008 (Toronto International Film Festival); April 9, 2010 (United States)
- Running time: 90 minutes
- Country: United States
- Language: English

Who Do You Love? is a 2008 film biopic of American record producer Leonard Chess (1917–1969). It was directed by Jerry Zaks and written by Peter Martin Wortmann and Robert Conte, and stars Alessandro Nivola as Chess. The cast also includes David Oyelowo as Muddy Waters.

The film was named after the Bo Diddley song "Who Do You Love?", which was co-produced by Marshall Chess.

Location filming was in New Orleans.

== Cast ==
- Jon Abrahams – Phil Chess
- Tim Bellow – Chuck Berry
- Brett Beoubay – Bo Diddley's Manager
- Robert Randolph – Bo Diddley
- Rus Blackwell – Missouri Sheriff
- Marcus Lyle Brown – Jess
- Chris Burnett – Stage Manager
- Joe Chrest – Malcolm Chisholm
- Heather Clark – Waitress Deloris
- Noell Coet – Frances
- Joshua Davis – Terry Chess
- Miko DeFoor – Little Walter
- Marika Dominczyk – Revetta Chess
- Dominique DuVernay – Core Swing Dancer
- Thomas Elliott – Radio DJ
- J. D. Evermore – Jake
- Madeline Gaudet – Concert Fan
- Lisa Goldstein – Sheva Chess
- Russell M. Haeuser – Concert security guard
- T. J. Hassan – Lonnie Johnson
- Brent Henry – Police Officer
- Albert H. Bongard IV – Security Guard
- Elise Kaywood – Dancer
- Jeremy Evan Kerr – Assistant Stage Manager
- Cynthia LeBlanc – Concert Fan
- Elton LeBlanc – Security Guard
- Ian Leson – Alan Freed
- Naima Imani Lett – Chess Receptionist
- Earl Maddox – Bar Owner
- Tendal Mann – Marshall Chess
- Roy McCrerey – Hank Lakin
- Hunter McGregor – Petey
- Crystal Morgan – Concert Fan
- Alessandro Nivola – Leonard Chess
- David Oyelowo – Muddy Waters
- Logan Starlarow – Ethan
