= Footlights Theater =

American TV anthology series (1952–1953)

Footlights Theater is a 30-minute American television anthology series that aired on CBS on Fridays in the summers of 1952 and 1953 as a replacement for Our Miss Brooks.

The program was broadcast on Friday nights from July 4, 1952, to September 26, 1952, and from July 3, 1953, to September 25, 1953. A total of 22 episodes were produced live in New York City and were directed by Fletcher Markle and Robert Stevenson. Some of its scripts were original and some were adapted from novels. The first season in 1952 was broadcast live, while the second season in 1953 was filmed rather than broadcast live.

== Partial list of episodes ==
=== 1952 ===
Date	Title	Star(s)
August 15, 1952	"The Big Hello"	Cesar Romero, Jeanne Cagney, Raymond Burr, Kathryn Card
August 22, 1952	"The Man Who Had Nothing to Lose"	Porter Hall, Neville Brand, Elisabeth Risdon, Alan Bridge
August 29, 1952	"Mechanic on Duty"	Gale Storm, Gene Raymond, Clem Bevans, Russell Hicks, Erville Alderson
September 5, 1952	"A Man's First Debt"	Lloyd Bridges, Eduardo Ciannelli, Maria Palmer, Jeffrey Silver, Richard Barron, John Frazer
September 12, 1952	"The Other Jesse Grant"	Gladys George, Elisabeth Risdon, Katherine Warren, Kenneth Patterson, Ted Osborn, Myra Marsh, Cecil Elliot
September 19, 1952	"The Hot Welcome"	Gale Storm, Richard Denning, Elizabeth Patterson, Tony Caruso
September 26, 1952	"T K O"	Regis Toomey, Richard Jaeckel, Jack Bernardi, John Gallaudet, Natalie Schaefer, Jeffrey Silver, Mary Jane Saunders, Carey Loftin, Sarah Spencer

=== 1953 ===
Date	Title	Star(s)
July 11, 1953	"Change of Heart"	Barbara Hale, Stephen McNally
July 18, 1953	"National Honeymoon"	Diana Lynn, Dick Haymes
August 8, 1953	"They Also Serve"	John Hodiak, Maureen O'Sullivan
August 14, 1953	"All's Fair in Love"	Cesar Romero, Lynn Bari, June Vincent
September 26, 1953	"Double Exposure"	George Brent, Dan Duryea, Marvin Kaplan

== Notable guest stars ==
- Lloyd Bridges
- Richard Carlson
- Broderick Crawford
- Ellen Drew
- Edmund Gwenn
- Barbara Hale
- Ruth Hussey
- Anita Louise
- Mercedes McCambridge
- Maureen O'Sullivan
- George Reeves
- Tommy Rettig
- Gale Storm
- Beverly Washburn
- Gig Young
