= By Any Other Name =

- Star Trek: The Original Series episode
- Episode no.: Season 2 Episode 22
- Directed by: Marc Daniels
- Story by: Jerome Bixby
- Teleplay by: D. C. Fontana; Jerome Bixby
- Cinematography by: Keith C. Smith
- Production code: 050
- Original air date: February 23, 1968

Guest appearances
- Barbara Bouchet – Kelinda; Warren Stevens – Rojan; Stewart Moss – Hanar; Robert Fortier – Tomar; Lezlie Dalton – Drea; Carl Byrd – Lt. Shea; Julie Cobb – Yeoman Thompson; Frank da Vinci – Lt. Brent; Eddie Paskey – Lt. Leslie; William Blackburn – Lt. Hadley; Roger Holloway – Lt. Lemli

Episode chronology
← Previous "Patterns of Force"	Next → "The Omega Glory"
- Star Trek: The Original Series season 2

"By Any Other Name" is the 22nd episode of the second season of the American science fiction television series Star Trek. Written by D.C. Fontana and Jerome Bixby (based on Bixby's story) and directed by Marc Daniels, it was first broadcast February 23, 1968.

In the episode, beings from another galaxy commandeer the Enterprise in an attempt to return home.

The title is taken from a line spoken by Juliet in William Shakespeare's play Romeo and Juliet: "that which we call a rose / By any other name would smell as sweet", a line quoted by Captain Kirk during the episode.

== Plot ==
The Federation starship USS Enterprise responds to a distress call from an uncharted planet. A landing party beams down to locate the source and promptly encounters a humanoid male and female, Rojan and Kelinda, who are from the Kelvan Empire. They immediately paralyze Kirk and the landing party and order Kirk to surrender the Enterprise. Rojan informs Kirk that the Kelvans originate from the Andromeda Galaxy and have come to the Milky Way galaxy to find planets suitable for conquest. Since their own ship was destroyed by the negative-energy barrier at the galactic rim, they need the Enterprise to make the 300-year return journey. Three other Kelvans beam aboard the Enterprise and quickly gain control of the ship.

Rojan orders the landing party to a cave guarded by Kelinda. Mr. Spock uses his Vulcan telepathic abilities to lure her into the cave, where Kirk knocks her unconscious and seizes her control belt. Spock is thrown back out of the mind meld due to the Kelvans' alien physiology. As punishment, Rojan orders the Kelvan Hanar to activate his belt, transforming two landing team members into small, spongy cuboctahedral blocks of a chalk-like substance. Rojan picks up the blocks, crushes one to dust—killing Yeoman Thompson—and transforms the other block (Lt. Shea) back into human form.

Back in their cell, Spock relates the experience of his mental contact with Kelinda. The Kelvans, it seems, are not humanoid after all, but have taken human form for convenience; they are actually huge creatures with hundreds of tentacles.

Kirk and Spock decide to adapt McCoy's neural scanning equipment into a countermeasure against the Kelvans' paralysis field. As a pretext for beaming back to the ship, Spock feigns illness by entering a deep trance. The Kelvans transport the rest of the landing party and themselves to the ship shortly afterward.

Spock concludes that penetrating the paralysis field projector's casing is impossible. Instead, he has Scott rig the matter/antimatter system to explode upon contact with the galactic barrier if Kirk gives the order, though Kirk chooses not to activate it.

Once the ship crosses the galactic barrier, the Kelvans reduce ("neutralize") all personnel except Kirk, Scott, Spock, and McCoy into spongy cuboctahedral blocks of a chalk-like substance. Spock recalls more from his mental contact with Kelinda and reveals that, in their natural form, the Kelvans have very weak senses and emotions, but in their present form, they exhibit human reactions. Kirk decides to use their inexperience with physical and emotional stimuli against them.

Scott introduces the Kelvan engineer Tomar to the alcoholic beverages such as Saurian Brandy, something "green" from Ganymede and finally "very very very old scotch", McCoy injects Hanar with a "supplement" for Anemia that is actually a stimulant, and Kirk begins a flirtation with Kelinda, provoking jealousy in Rojan. Kirk is eventually able to goad Rojan after "apologizing" to Kelinda again into attacking him, and, in the course of the fight, points out that Rojan is behaving like a human and that his descendants who reach the Andromeda Galaxy will be alien inferiors in the eyes of the Kelvans. Realizing Kirk is correct, Rojan relinquishes control of the ship to Kirk, who then gives the order to return "home" to our galaxy while sending a "robot ship" to Kelva with a Federation proposal. The world on which Rojan and his people were marooned is suggested as their new home.

== Reception ==
In 2018, Collider ranked this episode the 9th best original series episode.
