= Day of the Dove =

- Star Trek: The Original Series episode
- Episode no.: Season 3 Episode 7
- Directed by: Marvin J. Chomsky
- Written by: Jerome Bixby
- Cinematography by: Al Francis
- Production code: 066
- Original air date: November 1, 1968

Guest appearances
- Michael Ansara – Kang; Susan Howard – Mara; David L. Ross – Lt. Johnson; Mark Tobin – Klingon

Episode chronology
← Previous "Spectre of the Gun"	Next → "For the World Is Hollow and I Have Touched the Sky"
- Star Trek: The Original Series season 3

"Day of the Dove" is the seventh episode of the third season of the American science fiction television series Star Trek. Written by Jerome Bixby and directed by Marvin Chomsky, it was first broadcast November 1, 1968.

In the episode, an alien forces the crew of the Enterprise into a brutal conflict with the Klingons.

== Plot ==
The Federation starship Enterprise responds to a distress call from a human colony, but on arrival finds no signs of any type of inhabited settlement. A landing party, including Captain Kirk and Ensign Chekov, beams down to investigate further. A few moments later, they are found and surrounded by Klingons who have transported to the surface from their own orbiting vessel. Commander Kang accuses the Enterprise crew of firing upon their vessel and demands that they surrender immediately. Suddenly, Chekov makes a move to attack the Klingons, claiming they had killed his brother. Kang's men subdue him and use an agonizer device to torture him, forcing Kirk to agree to surrender. However, upon contacting the ship and asking to be beamed up, Kirk secretly warns First Officer Spock about the Klingons. Spock uses the transporter to materialize the Enterprise crewmen first, followed by the Klingons, who are overpowered by Enterprise security personnel. Kang surrenders and he and the other Klingons, including his wife Mara, a science officer, are escorted to secure quarters on the ship.

Meanwhile, a glowing entity composed of pure energy, which had initially emerged on the planet below, enters the Enterprise undetected and interfaces with its controls. The ship lurches into warp at maximum speed headed for the edge of the galaxy. With the crew panicked, the entity then traps 392 members of the Enterprise's crew belowdecks by closing bulkheads and making them impenetrable. The 38 remaining members of the crew are equal in numbers to the Klingons. With tempers high – and spurred on by the sudden materialization of swords and other antique hand weapons – they begin to fight.

Spock soon detects the entity, apparently feeding off the violence. When informed by Lt. Sulu that Chekov never had a brother and is an only child, Kirk realizes that the entity is capable of implanting false memories in order to trigger aggression. Kirk and Spock try to calm the crew's escalating furor to no avail. Kirk believes that if he can get to Kang, the Klingon commander can help stop his crew from fighting and help return the ship to a normal state.

Kirk and Spock work their way through the animosity aboard the ship and happen upon Chekov sexually assaulting Mara. Kirk pulls Chekov from her and knocks him unconscious, relenting only when Spock reminds him that Chekov was not in control of himself. Bringing Mara along, they take Chekov to Sickbay, where Dr. McCoy reports that crewmen gravely wounded in the fighting are healing at a much faster than normal rate; the entity wants everyone alive and fighting. Mara is initially skeptical that the entity exists, but is persuaded after realizing Kirk is completely unwilling to kill her. She agrees to lead Kirk to Kang in Engineering. They travel by the risky technique of intra-ship beaming – using the transporter between two points within the ship.

In Engineering, Kang distrusts Kirk's explanation of the entity despite Mara's assurance, and believing she was assaulted, challenges Kirk to a sword duel. As they clash, and with the entity hovering and pulsating a bright red nearby, Kirk implores Kang to stop, telling him that they may become its puppets for a thousand lifetimes if they continue to fight. Kang acknowledges Kirk's warning and the fact that their fighting is pointless. Kirk and Kang order their respective crews to lay down their arms. To starve the entity, Kirk and Kang encourage their crews to act jovially and to laugh with one another loudly. The entity fades and leaves the ship.

== Production ==
This episode was remastered in 2006 and aired January 5, 2008, as part of the remastered Original Series. It was preceded three weeks earlier by the remastered version of "A Taste of Armageddon" and followed a week later by the remastered version of "Who Mourns for Adonais?" Aside from remastered video and audio, and the all-CGI animation of the USS Enterprise that is standard among the revisions, specific changes to this episode also include:

- The planet Beta XII-A has been given a more realistic Earth-like appearance.
- New scenes and more dramatic shots of the Klingon battle cruiser have been added, including replaced footage of the ship as it explodes above the planet.

== Reception ==
Zack Handlen of The A.V. Club gave the episode a 'B−' rating, describing it as having potential, but being hampered by a script that fails to act on that. Io9's 2014 listing of the top 100 Star Trek episodes placed "Day of the Dove" as the 99th best episode of all series up to that time, out of over 700 episodes of the franchise.

In 2016, SyFy ranked guest star Michael Ansara as Kang (the Klingon leader), as the 13th best guest star on the original series. Ansara went on to reprise his role as Kang decades later on the Star Trek spin-offs Star Trek: Deep Space Nine and Star Trek: Voyager. Ansara reprised the character Kang in DS9's "Blood Oath", which also featured John Colicos as Kor and William Campbell as Koloth, who, like Ansara, had been guest stars in the original series playing original Klingons with that name.

In 2018, Collider ranked this episode the 16th best original series episode.

== Home media ==
This episode was released on LaserDisc, paired with "Spectre of the Gun" in 1987 in the United States.

This episode was released in Japan on December 21, 1993 as part of the complete season 3 LaserDisc set, Star Trek: Original Series log.3. A trailer for this and the other episodes was also included, and the episode had English and Japanese audio tracks. The cover script was スター・トレック TVサードシーズン for the set.
