= Gary Weeks =

American actor

- Born: Wiesbaden, Hessen, West Germany
- Education: University of Georgia
- Occupations: Actor, film producer and screenwriter
- Years active: 1998–present
- Website: www.garyweeks.net

Gary Weeks is an American film and television actor; he is also a film producer and screenwriter.

== Biography ==
Gary Weeks was born in Wiesbaden, Hessen, Federal Republic of Germany on a U.S. airbase. He was raised in Georgia, attended high school at Lakeside High School in Alabama, and he attended The University of Georgia and Georgia State University.

Weeks has appeared in over 50 television productions and more than 25 film productions.

He is best known as Luke Maybank in the Netflix series Outer Banks, Campbell in the television series Burn Notice and as Nick Newport Jr. in Parks and Recreation.

His recent feature films include Spider-Man: No Way Home (2021), Greenland (2020), Spider-Man: Homecoming (2017), Instant Family, Five Feet Apart (2019).

Weeks has also written/produced/directed films such as Deadland and Meth Head, as well as the festival darling 29 Reasons to Run.

== Filmography ==
Film roles
Year	Title	Role	Notes
2000	Disney's The Kid	Russ' Son	Uncredited
2001	Waiting on the Lost	Ethan Evans	
2004	The Drone Virus	Security Guard #1	
2005	Morphin(e)	Sheriff Tim Goodman	
2006	29 Reasons to Run	Jack Paradise	
2007	Murphy	Ed Murphy	
2009	Clones Gone Wild	Keenan	
2009	Deadland	Sean Kalos	
2009	Nowhere To Hide	Officer Randolph	
2009	A Line in the Sand	LCpl. David Miller	
2010	Elena Undone	Barry	
2012	A Perfect Ending	Dr. Weiller	
2013	The Spectacular Now	Joe	
2013	Identity Thief	Prominence Security Guard	
2013	Devil's Knot	TV Reporter at Weaver	
2013	Anchorman 2: The Legend Continues	Scout Leader	
2014	Ride Along	Dr. Cowan	
2014	Love Sick Lonnie	Franz	Short film
2014	Bet on Red	Sean	Short film
2015	Project Almanac	Ben Raskin	
2015	For the Love of Ruth	Peter	
2015	Jurassic World	Father of Three	
2015	Self/less	Chauffeur	
2016	The Divergent Series: Allegiant	Perfexia Father	
2016	The Nice Guys	Officer McMillian	
2016	Annabelle Hooper and the Ghosts of Nantucket	Burt Hooper	
2016	Sully	Reporter #3	
2016	Hidden Figures	Reporter at Press Conference	
2017	The Fate of the Furious	Super Jet Pilot	
2017	All Eyez on Me	Attorney	Uncredited
2017	Spider-Man: Homecoming	Agent Foster	
2018	The 15:17 to Paris	Recruiter	
2018	Rampage	Police Captain	
2018	Nightclub Secrets	Richie	
2018	The Mothers	Jacob Watkins	Short film
2018	Instant Family	Dirk	
2019	Five Feet Apart	Tom	
2020	Greenland	Ed Pruitt	
2021	The Tomorrow War	News Reporter #1	
2021	Spider-Man: No Way Home	Agent Foster	

Television roles
Year	Title	Role	Notes
1999	Sunset Beach	Police Officer	1 episode; uncredited
2000	Courage	Jason Polonsky	Episode: "Honeymoon Horror"
2000	Courage	Charlie Nett	Episode: "Kenyan Catastrophe"
2001	The Chronicle	Darren	Episode: "Baby Got Back"
2001	The Invisible Man	Security Guy	2 episodes
2001-2002	Star Trek: Enterprise	Engineer	13 episodes; uncredited
2002	Red Skies	Agent #1	TV movie
2003	Tremors	Brock	Episode: "Blast from the Past"
2003	Hunter	Lt. Kroft	Episode: "Need to Know"
2003	Threat Matrix	State Policeman	Episode: "Natural Borne Killers"
2003	Black Sash	Cop	2 episodes
2003-2005	Passions	Harmony Cop	6 episodes
2004	Tiger Cruise	Lt. Tom Hillman	TV movie
2004	The Perfect Husband: The Laci Peterson Story	Jail reporter #3	TV movie
2005	24	Agent Dalton	Episode: "Day 4: 8:00 p.m.-9:00 p.m."
2005	Summerland	Officer Raleigh	Episode: "Careful What You Wish For"
2005	The O.C.	Cop #2	Episode: "The Aftermath"
2006	Veronica Mars	Detailer	Episode: "The Quick and the Wed"
2006	CSI: Miami	Male Bystander	Episode: "Free Fall"
2006	After Midnight: Life Behind Bars	Kevin	TV movie
2006-2007	Wicked Wicked Games	Tom Anderson	7 episodes
2007	Chuck	Fireman	Episode: "Chuck Versus the Nemesis"
2008	The Office	Cop #1	Episode: "Dinner Party"
2008	Shark	EPA Worker	Episode: "Bar Fight"
2008-2012	Burn Notice	Campbell	4 episodes
2009	Monk	Mr. Cooper	Episode: "Mr. Monk's Favorite Show"
2010	Parks and Recreation	Nick Newport Jr.	Episodes: "Sweetums"
2010	All My Children	Dr. Clayton	2 episodes
2010	Next Stop Murder	Officer Maslar	TV movie
2010	NCIS: Los Angeles	Clay Mastin	Episode: "Black Widow"
2011	Red Shift	Bryce	TV Pilot
2011	Big Love	Sheriff Dent	Episode: "Exorcism"
2011	The Event	Ted Fisk	Episode: "A Message Back"
2011	Days of Our Lives	Scott Albright	4 episodes
2011	Zombie Apocalypse	Mack	TV movie
2012	Fetching	Beautiful Pajama Guy	Episode: "A Girl's Best Friend"
2012	Blackout	Detective Campbell	2 episodes
2012	Drop Dead Diva	Tom Witten	Episode: "Rigged"
2012	Army Wives	Capt. Gino Carrigan	Episode: "Handicap"
2012	The Walking Dead	Corporal	Episode: "Walk with Me"
2012	Nashville	Reid Olson	Episode: "You're Gonna Change (Or I'm Gonna Leave)"
2012	Cassandra French's Finishing School	Detective Bates	Episode: "Pilot"
2013	Revolution	Marcus Miller	Episode: "Home"
2013	Under the Dome	Norrie's Dad - Michael	Episode: "Blue on Blue"
2013	Company Town	Chuck Friel	TV Pilot
2014	Resurrection	Deputy Andrew Chartman	3 episodes
2014	Reckless	A.S. Ken Gorman	Episode: "Blind Sides"
2014	Satisfaction	Devon	Episode: "...Through Self Discovery"
2014	The Assault	Dan Gleason	TV movie
2015	Hindsight	Anton Toubassy	Episode: "Square One"
2015	Finding Carter	Agent Lee	2 episodes
2015	Complications	Rob Ellison	Episode: "Pilot"
2015	Devious Maids	Detective Boyd	Episode: "Anatomy of a Murder"
2015	South of Hell	Terence Clay	Episode: "The One That Got Away"
2016	Saints & Sinners	Tom Williams	Episode: "Don't Go"
2016	Halt and Catch Fire	Tim Henkel	Episode: "One Way or Another"
2016	Greenleaf	Adrian Miller	4 episodes
2016	Killing Reagan	Stephen Colo	TV movie
2017	MacGyver	Agent Brooks	Episode: "Fish Scaler"
2017	The Haves and the Have Nots	Agent Harris	4 episodes
2018	The Inspectors	Vince Marshall	Episode: "Window Washers"
2018	Hap and Leonard	Agent Glen	Episode: "Monsoon Mambo"
2018	Marvel's Cloak & Dagger	Greg Pressfield	3 episodes
2018	Limbo	Det Bob Simpson	TV movie
2018	Equilibrium	TBA	Episode:"Pilot"
2020–2021; 2024	Outer Banks	Luke	8 episodes
2020–2022	Sweet Magnolias	Ashley Davenport	5 episodes
