= Requiem for Methuselah =

- Star Trek: The Original Series episode
- Episode no.: Season 3 Episode 19
- Directed by: Murray Golden
- Written by: Jerome Bixby
- Cinematography by: Al Francis
- Production code: 076
- Original air date: February 14, 1969

Guest appearances
- James Daly – Flint; Louise Sorel – Rayna Kapec; William Blackburn – Lt. Hadley; Roger Holloway – Lt. Lemli

Episode chronology
← Previous "The Lights of Zetar"	Next → "The Way to Eden"
- Star Trek: The Original Series season 3

"Requiem for Methuselah" is the nineteenth episode of the third season of the American science fiction television series Star Trek. Written by Jerome Bixby and directed by Murray Golden, it was first broadcast on February 14, 1969.

In the episode, the crew of the Enterprise encounters an immortal human.

Its repeat broadcast, on September 2, 1969, was the last official telecast of the series to air on NBC. Star Trek immediately appeared in syndication on the following Monday, September 8, a full three years after its debut.

== Plot ==
The crew of the Federation starship Enterprise is struck with deadly Rigellian fever, for which the only treatment is the mineral ryetalyn. Captain Kirk, first officer Spock and medical officer Dr. McCoy beam down to the planet Holberg 917-G in search of the substance and are attacked by an airborne robot, which is called off by its master, Flint. Flint demands they leave immediately, but Kirk orders the Enterprise to fire phasers on their coordinates if they are attacked. Acknowledging a stalemate, Flint agrees to let them remain long enough to obtain the ryetalyn.

Flint offers the help of his sentry robot M4 to gather the mineral and escorts them to his home, which has an impressive art collection. Spock notices that the brushwork of the paintings is identical to Leonardo da Vinci's, but his tricorder indicates that they are made with modern materials.

The party is introduced to Flint's young ward, Rayna Kapec, whose late parents, according to Flint, were employees of his. On Flint's suggestion, Kirk plays billiards with Rayna, and they dance to a waltz played on the piano by Spock. The music, apparently in the hand of Johannes Brahms, is written with modern ink. M4 returns with a container of ryetalyn, but it is contaminated with irilium, and therefore useless. Flint apologizes and accompanies M4 on a search for more ryetalyn.

When Kirk kisses Rayna, M4 reacts as if he were attacking her. Spock destroys it with his phaser. The Enterprise reports that no information can be found on Flint or Rayna. A tricorder scan reveals that Flint is over 6,000 years old.

Rayna comes to say goodbye to Kirk, who has fallen in love with her and begs her to accompany him. McCoy tells them that after being processed in Flint's laboratory, the ryetalyn vanished. Spock follows tricorder readings to a laboratory chamber containing not only the ryetalyn, but a number of android bodies, all labeled "Rayna" and with a different number indicating earlier versions of her.

Flint reveals the truth. He was born in 3834 BC, and after falling in battle discovered he could not die. Flint has lived "lifetimes" as Methuselah, Alexander the Great, Solomon, Lazarus of Bethany, Leonardo da Vinci, Brahms, and many others. He built Rayna to be his immortal mate and manipulated Kirk into teaching her how to love. Paranoid about the possibility that the Enterprise crew would reveal him and his location, Flint causes the Enterprise to disappear from orbit and reappear as a tabletop miniature in his laboratory, with the crewmembers in suspended animation. He proposes to keep them that way for up to 2,000 years. Rayna happens into the room and vehemently objects, so he restores the starship to its previous state. When Kirk professes his love for Rayna and pleads with her to leave with him, a fight breaks out between him and Flint for the possession of Rayna. Rayna stops them, claiming her right to choose her own future, and then, overwhelmed by indecision for fear of hurting either Kirk or Flint, dies.

Back on the Enterprise, McCoy reports that readings from the earlier tricorder scan show that Flint has been aging normally since he left Earth's environment, and will soon die. Kirk falls asleep at his desk after commenting ruefully on his and Flint's behaviour, and Spock places a suggestion to "forget" into his mind.

== Production and reception ==
Rayna's last name, "Kapec", is an anagram of Capek, after Karel Čapek, whose play R.U.R. (Rossum's Universal Robots, 1920) introduced the term "robot".

=== Reception ===
In a 2010 review, Zack Handlen of The A.V. Club criticized the Rigellian fever scenario as contrived and wrote that Flint being numerous famous men from history was both completely irrelevant and contradictory to his claim that he had kept a low profile to avoid his immortality being discovered. He said that though the final scene is a highlight, it is undermined by Kirk's obsessive love for Rayna being so out-of-character as to be unbelievable. He gave the episode a C, summing it up as "forgettable". In 2017, Den of Geek ranked "Requiem for Methuselah" as the 15th "best worst" Star Trek: The Original Series episode, echoing Handlen's criticism that Kirk falling so intensely in love with Rayna over the course of just four hours was highly out-of-character.

=== Analysis ===
According to fantasy and science fiction scholar Ace G. Pilkington, "Requiem for Methuselah" is a Star Trek adaptation of the film Forbidden Planet (1956). Actress Anne Francis reported that Gene Roddenberry, the creator of Star Trek, had talked to her about lifting some ideas from Forbidden Planet. Actor Leslie Nielsen noted the similarities between Forbidden Planet and Star Trek, suggesting that the film served as a pilot for the television series.

Ruth Morse, a Shakespearean scholar, has written on the influence of The Tempest on Forbidden Planet and "Requiem for Methuselah". Flint, the powerful recluse, seems to be based on Prospero and Methuselah. Rayna appears to be Flint's daughter and is based on Miranda, Prospero's daughter. The twist here is that "Rayna-Miranda" (as Morse calls her) is an android, not Flint's daughter. Flint hopes that the female android will fall in love with him. Flint offers knowledge and intellectual stimulation but Rayna falls for the "irresistible" Kirk. The female android faces new and (to her) unfamiliar emotions, having to choose between two men. The pressure causes her to short-circuit into self-destruction, her version of death.

== 40th anniversary remastering ==
This episode was remastered in 2006 and aired June 21, 2008 as part of the remastered Original Series. It was preceded a week earlier by the remastered "The Way to Eden" and followed a week later by the remastered "The Savage Curtain". Changes made specific to this episode include:

- Flint's home is now a large palatial home, complete with observation tower. Originally, Flint's home was represented by a reuse of the matte painting of Rigel VII from "The Cage".
- Planet Holberg 917-G is now more realistic, with two moons orbiting behind it.
- The effect of the Enterprise being miniaturized from space is remastered.

== In other media ==
In several non-canonical Star Trek novels, the crew meet up again with the character Flint. The Cry of the Onlies by Judy Klass is a follow-on from both "Requiem for Methuselah" and "Miri". He is also encountered in Greg Cox's The Eugenics Wars: The Rise and Fall of Khan Noonien Singh as Dr. Evergreen, a 1980s scientist who discovers a hole in the ozone layer over Antarctica, in Immortal Coil by Jeffrey Lang, and in Federation by Judith and Garfield Reeves-Stevens as Zefram Cochrane's benefactor Micah Brack.

The author of the Star Trek screenplay, Jerome Bixby, would write a film script at the end of his life which has many plot elements of this previous story, including an ageless man who is 14,000 years old, and has been a student of the Buddha, while he himself was the basis for the story of Jesus. This film, The Man from Earth, was released in 2007.

In the crossover comic Star Trek/Legion of Super-Heroes, the crew of the Enterprise joins forces with the Legion of Super-Heroes to investigate an alternative timeline where Earth has become a galaxy-conquering empire, learning that the villain is immortal Vandal Savage, who turns out to be an alternative version of Flint, Flint being a Vandal Savage who turned his back on violence and conquest.

The character of Rayna appears briefly twice without speaking as a hallucination in Episode 4 of Star Trek Continues, "The White Iris", this time played by Gabriela Fresquez, Spock's removal of Kirk's memory having been loosened by a brain injury and an experimental drug. Since Star Trek Continues follows directly from the end of the original Star Trek series, presumably "The White Iris" occurs only a few weeks after the events of "Requiem for Methuselah".

== Home video releases ==
This episode was released in Japan on December 21, 1993 as part of the complete season 3 LaserDisc set, Star Trek: Original Series log.3. A trailer for this and the other episodes was also included, and the episode had English and Japanese audio tracks. The cover script was スター・トレック TVサードシーズン

This episode was included in TOS Season 3 remastered DVD box set, with the remastered version of this episode.

== See also ==
- The Tales of Hoffmann Act 1 (Olympia)
- Cultural references to Leonardo da Vinci

== Sources ==
- Morse, Ruth (2000). "Monsters, Magicians, Movies: The Tempest and the Final Frontier". In Holland, Peter (ed.). Shakespeare Survey: Volume 53, Shakespeare and Narrative: An Annual Survey of Shakespeare Studies and Production. Cambridge University Press. ISBN 978-0521781145.
- Pilkington, Ace G. (2015). "Forbidden Planet: Aliens, Monsters and Fictions of Nuclear Disaster". In Kapell, Matthew Wilhelm; Pilkington, Ace G. (eds.). The Fantastic Made Visible: Essays on the Adaptation of Science Fiction and Fantasy from Page to Screen. McFarland & Company. ISBN 978-0786496198.
