= Lady Luck (1946 film) =

1946 film

- Theatrical release poster
- Directed by: Edwin L. Marin
- Screenplay by: Lynn Root; Frank Fenton
- Story by: Herbert Clyde Lewis
- Produced by: Warren Duff
- Starring: Robert Young; Barbara Hale; Frank Morgan
- Cinematography: Lucien Andriot
- Edited by: Ralph Dawson
- Music by: Leigh Harline
- Production company: RKO Radio Pictures
- Distributed by: RKO Radio Pictures
- Release date: October 18, 1946
- Running time: 97 minutes
- Country: United States
- Language: English
- Budget: $877,000

Lady Luck is a 1946 American comedy film directed by Edwin L. Marin and starring Robert Young, Barbara Hale and Frank Morgan. It was produced and distributed by RKO Pictures. The picture tells the story of a professional gambler who falls in love with a woman who hates gambling and tries to reform him.

== Plot ==
Beautiful young Mary Audrey cannot stand gambling. Her grandfather, William, whom she calls "Gramps," is a compulsive gambler, descended from a line of compulsive gamblers who have always ended up losing all. Including him. Mary puts him to work in her newly opened Beverly Hills book store to try to keep him away from his bad habit.

While she is out and Grandpa minds the store, professional gambler, Larry Scott, comes in looking for a scratch sheet. Grandpa produces one, and Larry places a $200 wager with him, who cannot pay up when Larry's horse wins.

Grandpa seeks to skip town. Clueless of what became of him and why, Mary is beside herself. When Larry comes to collect his 6:1 winnings, he volunteers to help her find Gramps - without telling her why.

Larry falls for Mary, however, woos her, and when she reciprocates, weds her in Las Vegas.

Before their honeymoon can commence, he finally reveals his real profession, but swears he has given it up. However, drawn into the hotel's tables by old friend and gambling pal Sacramento Sam "for good luck", he soon feels guilty for making a smalltime amateur gambler lose his biggest ever poke (around $80, a small fortune to him) at craps, so he plays in his place until, after much effort, he wins the money back. Mary sees him doing so (without knowing the reason why) and angrily gets a quick divorce.

Sacramento Sam hatches a scheme to turn her into a gambler, recruiting suave con man Dan Morgan to romance her and gradually get her to gamble. He gets a casino to let her win $500, with Sam and Larry's other friends agreeing to reimburse its losses. However, Mary goes on a genuine epic winning streak and will not quit. Sam and the others go broke covering her winnings. She even wins a casino of her own on her tear and starts running it.

Larry returns to Beverly Hills, where he finds Gramps running a book out of Mary's store. Larry drives back to Vegas to try to persuade her to give up gambling. When he visits her in her hotel suite, he hears a man whistling from the bath room (whom he assumes is Dan). Furious he storms out. Later, he hears the same whistling and discovers it had been coming from Gramps (who had flown in ahead of him).

Sam has another brainstorm. He will play Gramps, Mary's casino's professional poker player, in order to break the house and cure Mary of the gambling itch so that she will return to Larry. In the final hand, Sam bets all he has. Gramps calls his bluff. Devastatingly, Sam missed out on a straight flush draw, and has only a pair of 8's to show. Sensing Sam's game, Gramps folds his winning full house, so Mary loses the casino and—as he had hoped—reconciles with Larry.

== Cast ==
- Robert Young as Larry Scott
- Barbara Hale as Mary Audrey
- Frank Morgan as Gramps Audrey
- James Gleason as Sacramento Sam
- Don Rice as Eddie
- Harry Davenport as Judge Martin
- Lloyd Corrigan as Little Joe
- Teddy Hart as Little Guy
- Joseph Vitale as Happy Johnson
- Douglas Morrow as Dan Morgan
- Myrna Dell as Mabel
- Mary Field as Miss Field
- Al Hill as Herman, Roulette Dealer
- Kenneth MacDonald as Masters, Casino Manager
- William Hall as Mabel's Boyfriend
- Russell Simpson as Daniel Boone
- Forrest Taylor as General Sherman
- Nancy Saunders as Manicurist

== Bibliography ==
- Neibaur, James L. The RKO Features: A Complete Filmography of the Feature Films Released Or Produced by RKO Radio Pictures, 1929-1960. McFarland, 1994.
- Parish, James Robert & Mank, Gregory W. The Hollywood Reliables. Arlington House, 1980.
