= October 22 (film) =

- Film poster
- Directed by: Richard Schenkman
- Written by: Fred Golan
- Produced by: Avi Lerner
- Starring: Amanda Plummer; Colm Meaney; Paul Perri; Michael Paré; Ernie Hudson; Mark Boone Junior
- Cinematography: Kim Haun
- Edited by: Donn Aron
- Music by: Midge Ure; Marcos 'Max' Vasquez; Josh Phillips
- Distributed by: Millennium Films
- Release date: November 4, 1998
- Running time: 94 minutes
- Country: United States
- Language: English

October 22 is a 1998 American drama film directed by Richard Schenkman and written by Fred Golan. It premiered at the Ft. Lauderdale Film Festival.

== Synopsis ==
A group of disparate patrons in a Los Angeles diner are having breakfast when a psychopath enters with a gun, holds them hostage, and has a standoff with the SWAT Team. The film then cuts to earlier that same day, showing how each character came to be in the diner. The narrative progresses non-sequentially but working towards the moment when the gunman opens fire. Each character is shown going about their daily lives, individually revealing themes of romance, obsession, and desperation. The film climaxes back in the diner and features a surprise twist ending.

== Cast ==
- Amanda Plummer as Denise
- Colm Meaney as Steve
- Paul Perri as Police Captain
- Michael Paré as Gary
- Ivana Miličević as Debra
- Mark Boone Junior as Bob
- Donna Murphy as Carole
- Ernie Hudson as Arthur
- Tate Donovan as Peter
- Erika Anderson as Maggie

== Reception ==
VideoHound's DVD Guide compared it to Pulp Fiction and The Life Before This.
