= Abraham Lincoln vs. Zombies =

- Film poster
- Directed by: Richard Schenkman
- Screenplay by: Richard Schenkman
- Story by: Karl T. Hirsch; Lauren Proctor
- Produced by: David Michael Latt
- Starring: Bill Oberst Jr.; Jason Vail; Baby Norman; Don McGraw
- Cinematography: Tim Gill
- Edited by: James Kondelik
- Music by: Chris Ridenhour
- Production company: Four Score Films
- Distributed by: The Asylum
- Release date: May 29, 2012
- Running time: 96 minutes
- Country: United States
- Language: English
- Budget: $150,000

Abraham Lincoln vs. Zombies is a 2012 American action comedy horror B movie directed by Richard Schenkman, with a screenplay by Schenkman based upon the story concept of Karl Hirsch and Lauren Proctor. Produced by The Asylum, and starring Bill Oberst Jr., the film was released direct-to-video on May 29, 2012, following its May 28 theatrical premiere screening at the Telfair Museum of Art Jepson Center in Savannah, Georgia.

In the tradition of The Asylum's catalog, the film is a mockbuster of the 20th Century Fox film Abraham Lincoln: Vampire Hunter.

== Plot ==
After his mother Nancy Lincoln turns into a zombie, 10-year-old Abraham Lincoln witnesses his father Thomas Lincoln commit suicide at her bedside. Taking up a scythe, Abe beheads his mother before joining his community in containing a local zombie outbreak.

As an adult, Lincoln is President of a fracturing United States when he hears rumours of a prominent Confederate stronghold. A regiment of 30 men had gone to Confederate Fort Pulaski to seize it, but only one survived. The survivor appears to have an illness that revives corpses, so Lincoln personally leads a team from the newly established secret service to investigate.

At the fort, they are attacked by Confederate survivors led by General Stonewall Jackson and by infected people. Abe kills a bitten member of his team and explains that bites, scratches, or infected blood entering the mouth or eyes cause infection, after which victims cease to be "human" within twenty-four hours. Further losses occur while investigating the surrounding neighbourhood, where Abe encounters his former lover, Mary Owens, now a prostitute. She is sheltering others, including a young Theodore Roosevelt, her daughter Sophia and prostitute Annika.

The group returns to the fort, where Jackson refuses to kill the infected, believing them merely ill and in need of treatment. Agent Brown, using an old Bantu word learned from his mother, names them "zombies". Pat Garrett joins Abe and leads the group to a plantation where they obtain farming implements and weapons. On their return, Mary is splashed with zombie blood and becomes ill. Agent John Wilkinson refuses to participate in the killings and stays behind, while the others enter the township. Only Abe, Theodore and Sophia survive. Wilkinson, secretly a spy, initially intends to kill Lincoln, but changes his mind after seeing him pray. Convinced by Garrett that Lincoln is right and escape is impossible, Jackson reveals a cache of gunpowder. They plan to trap the zombies inside the fort and destroy it. When the fuse goes out, Jackson relights it but is killed by the zombies. Abe and Brown escape before the fort explodes. Mary accepts her fate and leaves with Lincoln to die, devastating Sophia.

Eighteen months later, Abe visits Mary, who has been kept by a doctor unsuccessfully seeking a cure. While cleaning her restraint wounds, Mary scratches Abe, infecting him and forcing him to kill her. Knowing he is incurable, Abe sends a message to Wilkinson, whom he has discovered is actually John Wilkes Booth. Booth plans to kidnap Lincoln after the war ends with the Union victorious. The message tells Booth where Lincoln will be at the theatre the following night, enabling his assassination—deliberately arranged by Lincoln to prevent another outbreak.

== Cast ==
- Bill Oberst Jr. as Abraham Lincoln
  - Brennen Harper as 10-year-old Abraham Lincoln
- Chris Hlozek as Major John McGill
- Jason Hughley as Wilson Brown
- Jason Vail as John Wilkes Booth
- Don McGraw as General Stonewall Jackson
- Christopher Marrone as Pat Garrett
- Ron Ogden as Robert Chamberlin
- Chip Lane as Joshua Kearney
- Canon Kuipers as Young Theodore Roosevelt
- Kent Igleheart as Thomas Lincoln
- Rhianna Van Helton as Nancy Lincoln
- David Alexander as Edward Everett
- Bernie Ask as Edwin Stanton
- Debra Crittenden as Mary Todd Lincoln
- Kennedy Brice as Little Zombie Girl
- Claire Weinstein as Zombie Girl in the Closet
- Baby Norman as Mary Owens
- Hannah Bryan as Sophia
- Anna Fricks as Annika
- Nathaniel Grauwelman as Agent Hawkins

== Production ==
Casting took place in January 2012. Using mostly local talent, filming began on January 28 in Savannah, Georgia. Originally the script was set to shoot at a fort in Tennessee, but Savannah and Fort Pulaski were subsequently chosen for location shooting of scenes where Lincoln confronts zombies who had overrun a Confederate stronghold.

== Critical response ==
The choice of Bill Oberst Jr. in the lead role of Abraham Lincoln in Abraham Lincoln vs. Zombies has been praised, with criticisms otherwise aimed at the film's plot, supporting cast members, character development, and historical inaccuracies.

Jason Adams of JoBlo wrote that the film was what might be anticipated from The Asylum, in its being "extremely repetitive" and having a script filled with "terrible lines." Adams stated that the actors "pretty much suck post-colonial wastewater", except for Bill Oberst Jr. Scott Foy of Dread Central offered similar praise for Oberst's acting, but "overwritten dialogue scenes, wildly uneven pacing, and sometimes confusingly staged action scenes prevent Abraham Lincoln vs. Zombies from fully living up to its full potential." KDVR reported that in the film, director Richard Schenkman had created "an enjoyable little movie that is juuussttt this close to being great camp". Jessica Leigh Lebos of Connect Savannah wrote, "Abraham Lincoln vs. Zombies is terrible. In the best possible way." Lebos said Bill Oberst Jr. "gives a believable turn as Lincoln-as-badass while imbuing the character with the president’s signature stalwart leadership; his Gettysburg Address is so compelling, you might forget you’re watching a monster movie." Whitney Scott Bain of Starburst called Abraham Lincoln vs. Zombies "a sluggishly directed film from a weak script" but "aside from all the historical inaccuracies, laborious direction and bad script, it's Bill Oberest Jr's stand out performance as Abe Lincoln that steals the show. He's worth watching and he's what saves the picture."

== See also ==
- Cultural depictions of Abraham Lincoln
