= The Man from Earth: Holocene =

- Promotional poster
- Directed by: Richard Schenkman
- Screenplay by: Richard Schenkman; Emerson Bixby
- Story by: Richard Schenkman; Eric D. Wilkinson
- Based on: Characters by Jerome Bixby
- Produced by: Richard Schenkman; Eric D. Wilkinson
- Starring: David Lee Smith; William Katt; Vanessa Williams
- Cinematography: Richard Vialet
- Edited by: Bobby K. Richardson
- Music by: Mark Hinton Stewart
- Release dates: 10 June 2017 (Dances with Films Festival); 16 January 2018 (online)
- Running time: 98 minutes
- Country: United States
- Language: English

The Man from Earth: Holocene is a 2017 American science fiction drama film directed by Richard Schenkman and written by Richard Schenkman and Emerson Bixby, based on characters created by Bixby's father, science fiction writer Jerome Bixby. It is a sequel to the 2007 film The Man from Earth. David Lee Smith returns as the "John Oldman" character, the protagonist from the original film, although going by a different name. The marketing of the film was notable for leveraging a full spectrum of both conventional and "pirate" channels to maximize visibility and distribution.

== Plot ==
John, now going by the surname Young, teaches comparative religion at a community college in Chico, California. He is well-liked by students and married to fellow faculty member Carolyn Kittriss. For the first time in his life, John shows signs of ageing and a cut during a hunting trip indicates that his regenerative abilities are diminishing. When Isabel, an enthusiastic student, is allowed to borrow books from John's collection, she discovers one authored by Dr. Jenkins and signed for John Oldman. Curious, Isabel learns about another, controversial book he authored, an account of the 14,000-year-old John Oldman. Drawing parallels between Oldman and their teacher, she shares the discovery with her classmates Tara, Liko and Philip. They are open to the possibility that they are the same person, although Philip's faith is challenged with the book's claim that John was Jesus Christ (another possibility is that he may have been the Teacher of Righteousness). Their suspicions are confirmed when they obtain the book and see the only photo of Oldman, who is described as averse to being photographed to facilitate forging new identities.

Isabel attempts to contact Dr. Jenkins by email, but he rudely rejects her, assuming she is yet another person seeking to ridicule him. Undeterred, Isabel, Tara and Liko trespass into the Young household, discovering several books authored by John under various surnames. They also find a painting believed to be by Vincent van Gogh, which Isabel's cousin, an art major, considers possibly authentic supporting the book's claim that John had known van Gogh personally. The group later contacts a retired university professor who recalls meeting John during the 1950s.

Isabel leaves a voice message for Jenkins, but this time he is interested when she mentions John Young and agrees to meet them on the condition that they first provide a clear photo of John's face. After unsuccessful attempts to take a picture in class, they go into his house at night and photograph him while he is asleep. Jenkins, although somewhat hesitant as the purported John appears aged, agrees.

Shortly afterward, Tara visits John in his office. He becomes concerned when she cryptically claims to know his true identity. In tears, Tara explains that she has always felt lonely as well. When John attempts to comfort her, she makes a sexual advance, which he rejects, asking her to leave. Isabel scolds Tara when she confesses the incident, fearing that John may leave before Jenkins arrives. John is indeed preparing for departure, and his refusal to offer an explanation leads to an argument with his wife. That evening, the four confront John about the book's veracity. He admits to being Oldman but insists that the story was a fabrication and expresses regret that Jenkins damaged his own reputation by publishing it. To stop him, John is tased and restrained in his basement, assigning Philip to watch him while the others attempt to retrieve Jenkins, whose car has broken down nearby.

Upon regaining consciousness, John warns Philip that their actions are criminal but offers not to report them if he is released. Philip, however, persists in questioning John about Jesus. After a few evasions, John finally admits to having been Jesus, explaining that he has avoided garnering attention since witnessing the distortion of his moral teachings. Although Philip initially welcomes the idea that John is divine despite telling the truth, the situation becomes tense when John expresses that all religious paths lead to salvation. Recounting the Book of Revelation, Philip renounces John as the seven-headed beast and stabs him.

When Jenkins, Isabel, Liko and Tara arrive, they are shocked to find blood stains throughout the house, with both John and Philip missing. Weeks later, John has been hiding in the wilderness, and he arranges to meet with Harry. They speculate that his aging might result from the Holocene itself ending to herald the Anthropocene. John accepts Harry's invitation to live with his family.

Back in his home, Jenkins is visited by an FBI agent who knows about John's many identities and extraordinary age, adding that he is a suspect in many violent crimes, including Philip's disappearance. When he asks Jenkins whether he believes an immortal serial killer is possible, Jenkins replies that anything is.

== Cast ==
- David Lee Smith as John Oldman/John Young
- William Katt as Dr. Art Jenkins
- Vanessa Williams as Carolyn
- Michael Dorn as Dr. Gil Parker
- Sterling Knight as Philip
- Brittany Curran as Tara
- Carlos Knight as Liko
- Akemi Look as Isabel
- John Billingsley as Harry

== Production ==
In 2013, Schenkman expressed the motivations behind the production of the film:

"People have been asking for this since the first movie became a viral phenomenon. Over the years, I've spent time developing this property with the ultimate goal to create a long-form series. I've had a lot of help from a number of really talented people, and stunning support from fans all over the world. It's been a long road, but now that we're about to start shooting, I could not be more excited."

From 1 to 16 June 2016, principal photography for the film took place. Editing was completed on 21 September 2016. The producers have stated on Facebook that it could be the first in a series.

== Release and P2P distribution ==
On 16 January 2018, the creators uploaded this film to The Pirate Bay for completely legal download.

Other partners have included MovieSaints.com (effective as of 19 January 2018), where fans were able to pay to see the film but would receive a full refund if they did not enjoy it.
