= Naked Obsession =

1990 film directed by Dan Golden

Naked Obsession is a 1990 American film written and directed by Dan Golden and starring William Katt. It was produced by Roger Corman.

== Production ==
The script was based on the real-life Preppy Murder.
