= Deadland =

- Directed by: Damon O'Steen
- Written by: Gary Weeks
- Produced by: Jamie Millhoff; Brian Tee; Gary Weeks
- Starring: Gary Weeks; Brian Tee; William Katt
- Cinematography: Reuben Steinberg
- Edited by: Harry Frishberg; Max Frishberg
- Music by: Patrick Morganelli
- Production company: Deadeye Films
- Distributed by: Phase 4 Films
- Release date: April 18, 2009 (Atlanta Film Festival)
- Running time: 107 minutes
- Country: United States
- Language: English

Deadland is a 2009 American science fiction film directed by Damon O'Steen, written by Gary Weeks, and starring Weeks, Brian Tee, and William Katt as survivors in a post-apocalyptic society five years after the United States is destroyed in a nuclear holocaust.

== Plot ==
As Sean Kalos attempts to mend his relationship with Katie, his estranged wife, his cell phone goes dead. Kalos enters a gas station and requests assistance, only to find that the phones there have also died. The attendant, who is raptly watch a television broadcast, reveals that a nuclear war has broken out, and, outside the station, they watch the sky fill with incoming missiles. Five years later, the world has more-or-less acclimated to the changes, and a brutal post-apocalyptic society has sprung up. Although he had previously given up his wife for dead, Kalos attempts to avoid survivalists as he searches for her, following his discovery of an encrypted message that seemingly references her. With the help of Shiv, a quirky codebreaker, Katos learns that his wife may be the victim of experimental research in mutated super-soldiers. Kalos, skeptical of the existence of mutants, recruits Jax to help him rescue his wife from Commander Rufler, the brutal warlord of a local militia. He is aided by the Underground and their leader, Red.

== Cast ==
- Gary Weeks as Sean Kalos
- Brian Tee as Jax
- William Katt as Shiv
- Harrison Page as Red
- Chad Mathews as Harris
- Cullen Douglas as Nathaniel
- Mark Rickard as Tereshinski
- Emily-Grace Murray as Katie
- Philip Boyd as Anderson
- William Colquitt as Commander Rufler
- Davis Neves as Zoona

== Production ==
Deadland was shot in Georgia and California in 2007. Writer Gary Weeks was inspired after he left his cell phone at home. After going through technology withdrawal, he began thinking of the times when he lost access to other technological advances. He set the film five years in the future because he wanted to show a society that had adjusted to the most pressing dangers. He wanted the protagonist to find a reason to live, and, as a romantic, Weeks decided to make the plot a love story.

== Release ==
Deadland premiered at the Atlanta Film Festival on April 18, 2009. Phase 4 Films released it on DVD on November 23, 2010.

== Reception ==
Jeff Marker of The Gainesville Sun wrote "Deadland demonstrates what great things can be done by talented people on a shoestring budget." Curt Holman of Creative Loafing wrote that the plot is vague and has too many quirky characters, but the film is compelling and plausible. Ken Hanke of the Mountain Xpress called it "a solid movie with effective direction and some very good performances." Stina Chyn of Film Threat rated it 4/5 stars and wrote that it avoids the bleak themes of traditional post-apocalyptic films by focusing more on a love story than brutality and violence. Justin Felix of DVD Talk rated it 2.5/5 stars and wrote, "Deadland has flaws in its pacing and acting, but it's creative enough to stand out from its low budget brethren."
