= The Man from Earth =

2007 film by Richard Schenkman

- Theatrical release poster
- Directed by: Richard Schenkman
- Written by: Jerome Bixby
- Produced by: Richard Schenkman; Eric D. Wilkinson
- Starring: David Lee Smith; John Billingsley; Tony Todd
- Cinematography: Afshin Shahidi
- Edited by: Neil Grieve
- Music by: Mark Hinton Stewart
- Distributed by: Anchor Bay Entertainment; Shoreline Entertainment
- Release date: November 13, 2007
- Running time: 89 minutes
- Country: United States
- Language: English
- Budget: $200,000

The Man from Earth is a 2007 American science fiction drama film directed by Richard Schenkman. It was written by Jerome Bixby, who conceived the screenplay in the early 1960s and completed it on his deathbed in April 1998. It stars David Lee Smith as John Oldman, a departing university professor, who puts forth the notion that he is more than 14,000 years old. The entire film is set in and around Oldman's house during his farewell party and consists almost entirely of dialogue. The plot advances through intellectual arguments between Oldman and his fellow faculty members.

The screenplay mirrors similar concepts of longevity introduced by Bixby in "Requiem for Methuselah", a Star Trek episode he wrote, which originally aired in 1969. The Man from Earth gained recognition in part for being widely distributed through Internet peer-to-peer networks, which raised its profile. Schenkman later adapted the film into a stage play.

== Plot ==
Professor John Oldman is packing his belongings into his truck, preparing to move to a new home. His colleagues show up to give him an impromptu farewell party: Harry, a biologist; Edith, an art history professor and devout Christian; Dan, an anthropologist; Sandy, a historian who is in (unrequited) love with John; Art, an archaeologist; and his younger student Linda.

As John's colleagues press him to explain the reason for his departure, he builds on Dan's reference to Magdalenian cultures and, slowly and somewhat reluctantly, reveals that he was born in the Paleolithic period. He states that he has lived for more than 14 millennia and that he relocates every 10 years to prevent others from realizing he does not age. He begins his tale under the guise of a possible science fiction story, but eventually stops speaking in hypotheticals and answers questions from a first-person perspective. His colleagues refuse to believe his story but accept it as a working hypothesis to glean his true intentions. John relates that he was a Sumerian for 2000 years, later a Babylonian, and eventually went east to become a disciple of the Buddha. He claims to have had a chance to sail with Columbus (admitting that at the time he still believed the earth was flat) and to have befriended Van Gogh (one of whose original paintings he apparently owns, a gift from the artist himself).

During the conversation, each guest questions John's story based on their own academic specialty. Harry struggles with how biology could allow a human being to live so long. Art, arguably the most skeptical of the group, questions prehistory. He exclaims that all of John's answers, although correct, could have come from any textbook; John rejoins that, like any human, his memory is imperfect and he only sees events from his own narrow, hence not omniscient, perspective. Dr. Will Gruber, a psychiatry professor who arrives at Art's request later that afternoon, questions whether John feels guilty about outliving everyone he has ever known and loved. He then threatens John with a gun (later revealed to have been unloaded) before temporarily leaving. John then learns from Harry that Will's wife had died the previous day after a long illness. John chases after Will, expresses his condolences, and rejoins the group.

The discussion veers toward religion, and John mentions that he does not follow any religion. Even though he does not necessarily believe in an omnipotent God, he does not discount the possibility of such a being's existence. Pressed by the group, John reluctantly reveals that in trying to take the Buddha's teachings to the west, into the eastern Roman Empire, he became the inspiration for the Jesus story. After this revelation, emotions in the room run high. Edith, the representative Christian literalist of the group, begins crying. Will, who has returned after saying he drove around and did not know where else to go, demands that John end his tale and give the group closure by admitting it was all a hoax. He threatens to have John involuntarily committed for psychiatric evaluation should he refuse to do so. John appears to ruminate over his response before finally "confessing" to everyone that his story was a prank.

John's friends leave the party with various reactions: Edith is relieved, Harry is open-minded, Art never wants to see John again, Will still believes John needs professional help, Sandy and Linda clearly believe John, and Dan is implied to believe John. After everyone else but Will and Sandy has left, Will overhears their conversation, which suggests the story could be true after all. John mentions some of the pseudonyms he has used over the years, and Will realizes one in particular was his father's name. He asks John specific questions that only a very close acquaintance could answer. When John answers them all correctly, Will has an emotional breakdown, suffers a heart attack, and dies in John's arms. After the body has been taken away, Sandy realizes that (if the story is true) this is the first time John has seen one of his grown children die. John wordlessly gets into his truck and drives to an unknown destination. Having reconsidered, he then stops and waits for Sandy, who slowly walks over to the truck.

== Cast ==
In order of appearance:

- David Lee Smith as John Oldman
- Tony Todd as Dan
- John Billingsley as Harry
- Ellen Crawford as Edith
- Annika Peterson as Sandy
- William Katt as Art Jenkins
- Alexis Thorpe as Linda Murphy
- Richard Riehle as Dr. Will Gruber
- Robbie Bryan as Police Officer

== Production ==
The story is Jerome Bixby's last work, which he completed on his deathbed in April 1998. Bixby dictated the last of the screenplay to his son, screenwriter Emerson Bixby. After Jerome Bixby's death, the script was given to Richard Schenkman to direct on a budget of just US$200,000 (equivalent to $310,544 in 2025). The film was shot in eight days after a week of rehearsals.

The set for the film is located at 34855 Petersen Road, Agua Dulce, CA 91390. The set is affiliated with Agua Dulce Movie Ranch, Inc.

== Release and marketing ==
The film screened at the San Diego Comic-Con Film Festival in July 2007. It premiered theatrically in Hemet, California, and Pitman, New Jersey, in October 2007. It was released on DVD in North America by Anchor Bay Entertainment on November 13, 2007, and became available for digital rental and sale at iTunes on September 22, 2009. It won the grand prize for Best Screenplay and first place for Best Feature at the Rhode Island Film Festival in August 2007.

=== Publicity through filesharing ===
In 2007, producer Eric D. Wilkinson publicly thanked users of BitTorrent who distributed the film without express permission, saying that it lifted the profile of the film far beyond the financier's expectations; nevertheless, he encouraged fans to purchase the DVD or donate.

== Reception ==
On Rotten Tomatoes, it has a 100% score based on reviews from 5 critics.

IGN gave it an 8 out of 10, calling it "intellectual sci-fi".

DVD Verdict criticized the heavy-handed ending, saying that views on religion would shape one's opinion of the film.

=== Awards ===
The film has been nominated for and won numerous awards.

- 2007 – Winner – 1st place – Best Screenplay - Rhode Island International Film Festival
- 2007 – Winner – Grand Prize - Best Screenplay - Rhode Island International Film Festival
- 2008 – Winner – Best Film – Montevideo Fantastic Film Festival of Uruguay
- 2008 – Winner – Audience Choice Award Montevideo Fantastic Film Festival of Uruguay
- 2008 – Winner – Best Director - Fantaspoa – International Fantastic Film Festival of Porto Alegre, Brazil
- 2008 – Winner – 2nd place – Best Screenplay - Rio de Janeiro International Fantastic Film Festival (RioFan)
- 2008 – Winner – Audience Award: Best Screenplay Film – Fixion-Sars Horror & Fantastic Film Festival of Santiago, Chile
- 2008 – Winner – Jury Award: Best Screenplay – Fixion-Sars Horror & Fantastic Film Festival of Santiago, Chile
- 2008 – Winner – Best SCI-FI Screenplay - International Horror & Sci-Fi Film Festival, Phoenix, AZ
- 2008 – Winner – Best Screenplay - Buenos Aires Rojo Sangre – Int'l Independent Horror, Fantasy & Bizarre, Argentina
- 2007 – Saturn Award nominee - Best DVD Release - The Man From Earth
- 2008 – Winner – DVD Critics Award – Best Non-Theatrical Movie

== Soundtrack ==
All original music for the film was performed by Mark Hinton Stewart.

- "7th Symphony - 2nd Movement" - written by Ludwig van Beethoven
- "Forever"
  - Lyrics by Richard Schenkman
  - Music by Mark Hinton Stewart
  - Performed by Mark Hinton Stewart and Chantelle Duncan
  - Copyright - BDi Music Ltd

== Play ==
In 2012, Richard Schenkman adapted the film to a play, which received positive reviews.

In 2013, the theater play was staged in Greece.

== Sequels ==
A direct sequel, The Man from Earth: Holocene, was released in 2017, with David Lee Smith and William Katt respectively reprising their roles as John Oldman and Art Jenkins. Filming took place on June 2–16, 2016. The producers have stated on Facebook that it could be the first in a series.

Previously, two crowdfunding follow-ups had been made on Kickstarter. First, a campaign to crowdfund a sequel titled The Man From Earth II: Man From Earth Millennium was announced in September 2013, but it failed to secure the required minimum support by October 2013.

Also, an attempt was made to crowdfund a series, titled Man From Earth: The Series, which was completed successfully in August 2014, but the series never came to be.

== See also ==
- Immortality in fiction
- List of fictional immortals
- "Long Live Walter Jameson"
