= David Lee Smith =

American actor (born 1963)

- Born: September 8, 1963 (age 63); Birmingham, Alabama, U.S.
- Education: University of Alabama and Southern Methodist University
- Occupation: Actor
- Years active: 1993–present

David Lee Smith (born September 8, 1963) is an American actor.

== Early life, family and education ==
Smith was born in Birmingham, Alabama. He attended Banks High School. He graduated from the University of Alabama and Southern Methodist University.

== Career ==
Smith is known for his role as John Oldman, the protagonist of the 2007 science fiction film, The Man from Earth and its 2017 sequel, The Man from Earth: Holocene; he co-starred with John Billingsley and Tony Todd.

He has also appeared in other movies, including Fight Club, and dozens of television episodes, some as a recurring character such as IAB Sergeant Rick Stetler in CSI: Miami and Vincent Massey in Savannah.

== Filmography ==
- 1993: All My Children – John Youngblood
- 1996: Savannah – Vincent Massick
- 1997: Star Trek: Voyager (TV series, "Darkling") – Zahir
- 1997: The Naked Truth (TV series) – Mark
- 1998: Just Shoot Me! (TV Series, "In the Company of Maya") – Steve McPherson
- 1998: JAG – Lt. Cmdr. 'Karma' Rice
- 1999: Fight Club – Walter
- 2001: JAG – Maj. Miles Holmes
- 2002: A Walk To Remember – Dr. Carter (father of the protagonist Landon Carter)
- 2002: Divine Secrets of the Ya-Ya Sisterhood – Younger Shep Walke
- 2003–2010: CSI: Miami (TV series, Seasons 2–8) – IAB Sergeant Rick Stetler
- 2004: Mysterious Skin – Alfred
- 2007: Zodiac – Father of the witnesses
- 2007: The Man from Earth – John Oldman
- 2009: Mending Fences (TV movie) – Walt Mitchell
- 2009: Dollhouse (TV series, "A Love Supreme") – Clay Corman
- 2010: Janie Jones – Officer Dickerson
- 2013: Crimson Winter – King Aldric
- 2017: The Man from Earth: Holocene – John Young, aka John Oldman
- 2018: Between Worlds – Kirby
- 2019: A Walk with Grace – Nate
- 2023: Lawmen: Bass Reeves – Earl Van Dorn
