= William Katt =

American actor and musician (born 1951)

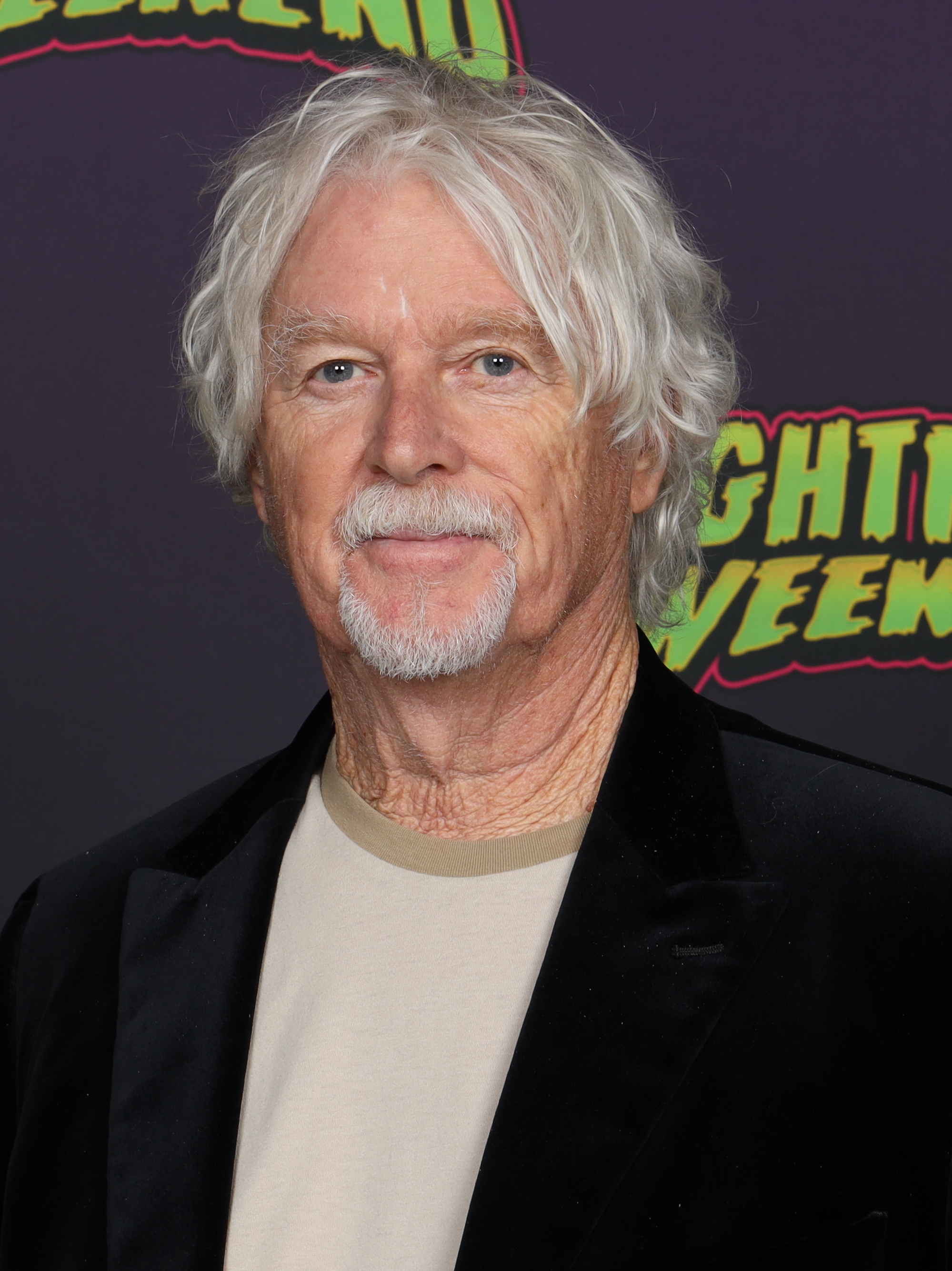
- Katt in 2024
- Born: William Theodore Katt; February 16, 1951 (age 75); Los Angeles, California, U.S.
- Other name: Billy Katt
- Occupations: Actor; musician
- Years active: 1970–present
- Spouses: Deborah Kahane (m. 1979; div. 1992) Danielle Hirsch (m. 1993)
- Children: 3
- Parents: Bill Williams (father); Barbara Hale (mother)

William Theodore Katt (born February 16, 1951) is an American actor and musician. He is best known for his starring role as Ralph Hinkley/Hanley on the ABC television series The Greatest American Hero (1981–1983).

Katt first became known for playing Tommy Ross, the prom date of Carrie White in the original film version of Carrie (1976). He subsequently starred in films such as First Love (1977), Big Wednesday (1978) and Butch and Sundance: The Early Days (1979). Between 1985 and 1988, he starred in nine Perry Mason television films alongside his mother Barbara Hale, who reprised her role as Della Street from the television series Perry Mason.

== Early life ==
Katt was born in Los Angeles to actors Bill Williams (birth name Herman August Wilhelm Katt) and Barbara Hale. His paternal grandparents were emigrants from Germany, while his mother had Irish and Scottish ancestry. He grew up in the San Fernando Valley and began acting as a teenager, sometimes appearing with his parents. He graduated from Army and Navy Academy, Carlsbad, California.

== Career ==
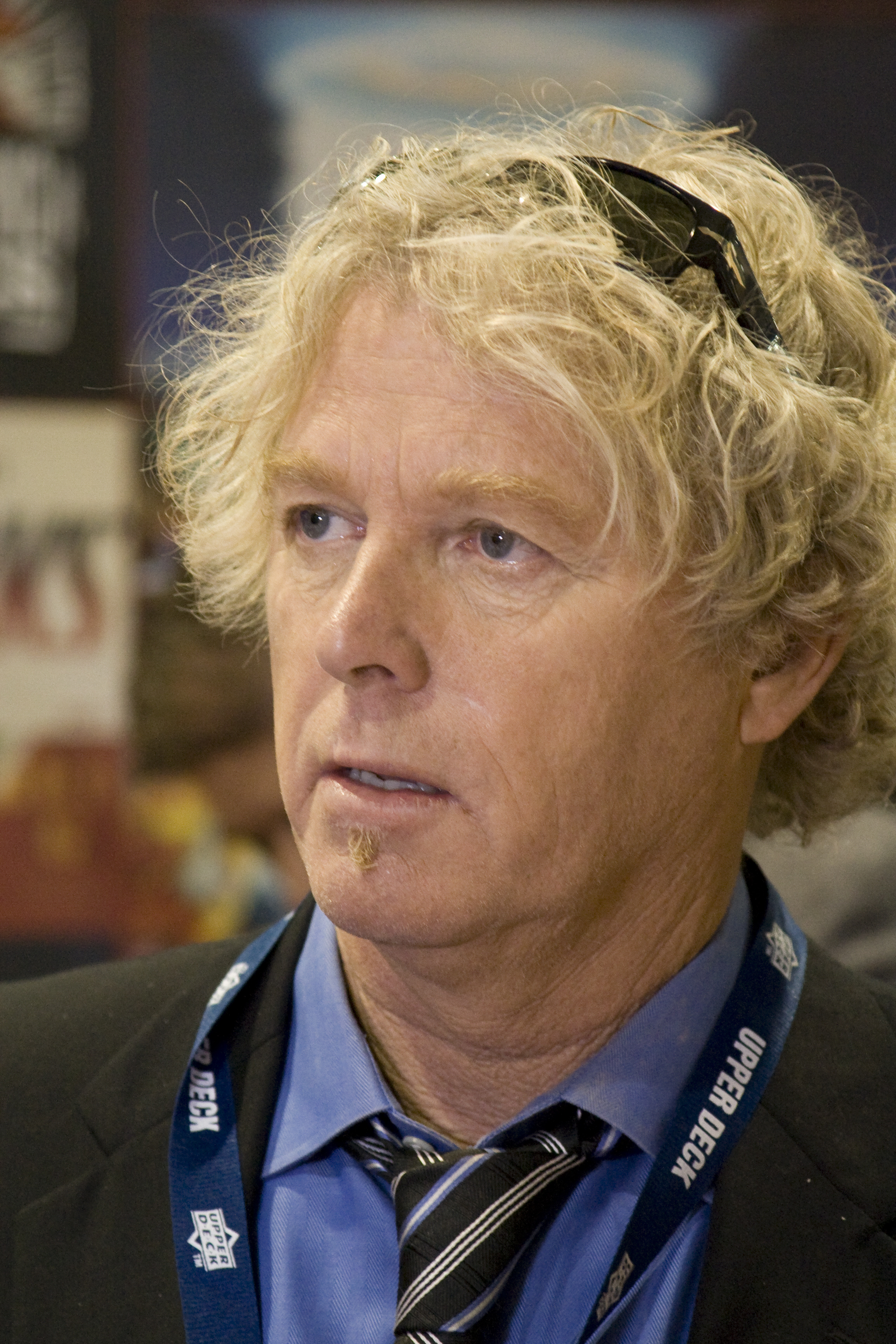
William Katt, 2008, at San Diego Comic-Con

Katt attended Orange Coast College before pursuing a career as a musician. Inspired by his father, he then started an acting career, appearing in summer stock theatre and in small television roles. His earliest film credits include the role of a jock, Tommy Ross, in Brian De Palma's 1976 horror film adaptation Carrie, which allowed Katt to make a name for himself. In 1978, he appeared as Barlow, a young surfer, in the John Milius drama film Big Wednesday opposite Jan-Michael Vincent and Gary Busey. His mother in that film was his real-life mother, Barbara Hale. The following year he took the role of Sundance Kid in the 1979 film Butch and Sundance: The Early Days. The role in Big Wednesday made him so well known in the surfing community that in 2004 he presented one of the Association of Surfing Professionals awards at their annual World Championship Tour ceremony to wild applause from the crowd of professional surfers. Katt explained in a 1979 interview with critic Roger Ebert that he was holding out only for parts that were personally interesting to him.

In December 1975, Katt auditioned for the part of Luke Skywalker in 1977's science fantasy George Lucas film Star Wars, and footage of his audition has been featured in many Star Wars documentaries. He was seriously considered for the role, which went to Mark Hamill, and Katt instead starred that year in First Love, playing a college student who experiences his first romantic relationship.

In 1981, Katt was cast as the title role in a filmed production of the Broadway musical comedy Pippin for Canadian television network CTV, which received mixed reviews. However, he landed on his best-remembered role that year, as Ralph Hinkley, a mild-mannered schoolteacher given a superpowered suit by aliens on the popular television series The Greatest American Hero, a role he played for three seasons until the show was canceled in 1983. Also starring veteran actor Robert Culp, the show retains a cult fanbase. Its theme song, "Believe It or Not", penned by Mike Post, also became a hit on the music charts. In 1982, due to the success of the first season of The Greatest American Hero, Katt signed to MCA and released a soft rock album, Secret Smiles under the name Billy Katt.

After The Greatest American Hero, Katt starred in Baby: Secret of the Lost Legend (1985), about explorers searching for apatosaurs in Africa, and the cult horror/comedy film House (1985); he later reprised his role for the third sequel, House IV, in 1992. Between 1985 and 1988, Katt starred in nine Perry Mason television films, playing the role of private detective Paul Drake Jr., son of Paul Drake, a fictional private detective in the Perry Mason television series and the Perry Mason series of detective stories written by Erle Stanley Gardner; Katt co-starred with his mother Barbara Hale, who reprised her role of Della Street from the Perry Mason television series. Katt starred in the 1989 TV series Top of the Hill and made a guest appearance on the first episode of the short-lived 1991 series Good Sports.

Katt continues to appear on television and in supporting film roles, and does voice acting as well. He appeared in an episode of House in 2006. In recent years, he has returned to genre work, with appearances in Andromeda and Justice League and roles in the award-winning film Gamers (2006), The Man from Earth (2007), and Alien vs Hunter (2007).

Katt briefly appeared in Heroes season 3 in "The Butterfly Effect" as a nosy reporter investigating Ali Larter's character. He portrayed Jack Matheson in the thriller film Mirrors 2. In 2010 during season 6, Katt guest starred as C.J. Payne's musician birth-father in the episode "Who's Your Daddy Now?" in the Tyler Perry comedy House of Payne.

Katt has also written a Greatest American Hero comic book and contributed to the series' Facebook page.

In 2013, Katt played himself in the spoof film Paranormal Movie directed by Kevin Farley. In 2014, he appeared in The Unwanted. In 2020, he appeared in The 2nd.

In 2026, Katt appears on NCIS as a doctor at a hospital. One of the characters comes to the pediatric cancer ward wearing a “Greatest American Hero” costume to entertain the children and Katt’s character escorts him to the ward after complimenting him on his suit.

== Personal life ==
Katt married Deborah Kahane in 1979 and they have two sons, Clayton and Emerson. They divorced in 1992.

He married Danielle Hirsch in 1993 and has a daughter with her, Dakota, as well as a stepson, Andrew.

== Selected filmography ==
=== Film ===
Year	Title		Notes
1971	The Late Liz	Peter Addams	Film debut
1976	Carrie	Tommy Ross	
1977	First Love	Elgin Smith	
1978	Big Wednesday	Jack Barlow	
1979	Butch and Sundance: The Early Days	Sundance Kid	
1985	Baby: Secret of the Lost Legend	George Loomis	
1985	House	Roger Cobb	
1988	White Ghost	Steve Shepard	
1989	Rising Storm	Elliot Kropfeld	Uncredited
1989	Wedding Band	Marshall Roman	
1990	Naked Obsession	Franklyn Carlysle	
1991	Last Call	Paul Avery	
1992	House IV: The Repossession	Roger Cobb	Direct-to-video
1992	Double X: The Name of the Game	Michael Cooper	
1993	Desperate Motive	Richard Sullivan	
1994	Cyborg 3: The Recycler	Decaf	Direct-to-video
1994	The Paperboy	Brian	
1994	Stranger by Night	Troy Rooney	Direct-to-video
1994	Tollbooth	Waggy	
1995	Piranha	Paul Grogan	Showtime TV Movie
1995	Problem Child 3: Junior in Love	Ben Healy, Jr.	Direct-to-video
1996	Daddy's Girl	Don Mitchell	
1997	u'Bejani	Father Bob	
1997	Whacked	Sgt. Niktaukus	Short
1998	Hyacinth	Andy Gillis	
1998	Deadly Game aka Catch me if you can	Jean Benoit	
1999	Twin Falls Idaho	Surgeon	
1999	Jawbreaker	Mr. Purr	
2000	The Clean and Narrow	George	Director
2000	Learning to Surf		
2001	Circuit	Gino	
2002	Snake Island	Malcolm Page	
2002	Treading Water	The Investor	
2003	Descendant	Dr. Tom Murray	
2005	River's End	Ed Kennedy	Director
2006	Gamers	Reese's Boss	
2006	Backstage Pass	Kurt Wilson	Direct-to-video
2007	The Man from Earth	Art	
2007	AVH: Alien vs. Hunter	Lee Cussler	Direct-to-video
2008	Big Game	Dave	
2008	Beautiful Loser	Father Hume	
2009	Deadland	Shiv	
2010	Earthling	Ryan Donnelly	
2010	Super	Sgt. Fitzgibbon	
2010	Mirrors 2	Jack Matheson	Direct-to-video
2010	Pure Country 2: The Gift	Winter	
2011	The Encore of Tony Duran	Art Smith	
2011	Stok Stalk Stock	Conscience	
2012	Sweetwater	Dean Taylor	
2013	Sparks	Matanza	
2013	.357	Smalls	
2013	Paranormal Movie	Houseguest Bill	
2013	The Secret Lives of Dorks	Mr. Thomas Gibson	
2014	The Unwanted	Troy	
2015	Subterranea	Mockenrue	
2017	The Man from Earth: Holocene	Dr. Art Jenkins	
2018	The Other Side of the Wind	Man in Bathroom Stall	
2020	The 2nd	Senator Bob Jeffers	
2021	Overrun	Detective Ed Dobbs	
2022	Pursuit	Taye Biggs	

=== Television ===
Year	Title	Role	Notes
1972	M.A.S.H.	Private First Class (P.F.C.)	Episode: "Dear Dad" - Credited as 'Bill Katt'
1974	Gunsmoke	Lonnie Weeks	Episode: "The Tarnished Badge"
1975	The Rookies	Jimmy Phillips	Season 3, Episode 10 - "The Old Neighborhood"
1981–1983	The Greatest American Hero	Ralph Hinkley	Lead role
1985–1988	Perry Mason Returns	Paul Drake, Jr.	Made for TV films – nine appearances
1998	Walker, Texas Ranger	Keith Portman	S6.E20: "Warriors"
1992–93	Sisters	Jeffrey Teller	
1993	Murder, She Wrote	Dereck Hartman	S9 Ep22
1994	Animaniacs	Dr. Roma	Voice, episode: "No Face Like Home"
1994	Batman: The Animated Series	Zowie	Voice, episode: "Riddler's Reform"
1994	Diagnosis Murder	Roland Spear	Episode: "Flashdance With Death"
1997	Rough Riders	Edward Marshall	TV Miniseries: 2 episodes
2001−2004	JAG	James Merrick	Episodes: "Collision Course" and "Corporate Raiders"
2001	Justice League	Scott Mason / Green Guardsman	Voice, episode: "Legends"
2006	House	Walter	Episode: "House vs. God"
2008	Batman: The Brave and the Bold	Hawkman	Voice, episode: "The Golden Age of Justice!"
2010	Numbers	Sven Regal	Episode: "And The Winner is"
2026	NCIS	Doctor	Episode: "Like and Subscribe"

=== Video games ===
Year	Title	Role	Notes
2010	Batman: The Brave and the Bold – The Videogame	Hawkman	Voice
