= Richard Schenkman =

American film director (born 1958)

- Born: Richard Schenkman; March 6, 1958 (age 68); New York City, New York, U.S.
- Education: University at Albany, SUNY
- Occupations: Film director, film producer, screenwriter
- Years active: 1988–present
- Children: Tiger Schenkman
- Website: www.richardschenkman.com

Richard Schenkman (born March 6, 1958) is an American screenwriter, film producer, film director, and occasional actor. He has also been credited as director under the names George Axmith and R.D. Braunstein.

== Early life and education ==
Schenkman was born in New York in 1958. He was educated at Roosevelt High School. Later, he attended the University at Albany, SUNY, where he graduated with a bachelor's degree in film in 1981.

== Career ==
Schenkman was the first production assistant at MTV: Music Television in 1981, where he directed, wrote and produced the first on-air promos that established the visual and aural vocabulary of the nascent cable network.

Schenkman's debut feature film, The Pompatus of Love, was co-written with Jon Cryer & Adam Oliensis, and directed by him. He then directed films such as October 22, Went to Coney Island on a Mission from God… Be Back by Five, and A Diva's Christmas Carol, for VH1.

Schenkman also developed content for television, including the sitcom pilot Us and Them for 20th Century Fox TV, and an animated series pilot for VH1 centered on Elvis. He also contributed dialogue to EA's video game 007 Racing.

After a hiatus, Schenkman directed more films including And Then Came Love, Abraham Lincoln vs. Zombies, Mischief Night, I Spit on Your Grave III: Vengeance Is Mine, and Misfits.

In 2007, Schenkman directed The Man from Earth. The film, widely pirated upon its release that same year, became a success. In 2017, he made a sequel, The Man from Earth: Holocene. Two months prior to its April 3 digital and DVD release, the film was released on The Pirate Bay in resolutions up to 1080p HD, including a message from Schenkman and producer Eric D. Wilkinson, encouraging donations from viewers.

Prior to his involvement in feature films, Schenkman had a career in corporate media. He contributed to the early branding of MTV by creating promos. Schenkman also established a production company, which produced various forms of media content, including commercials for Nickelodeon. Later, he joined Playboy Enterprises, where he was responsible for updating the network's visual presentation and overseeing the production of various programs, eventually serving as Vice President of Production.

== Writing ==
As a writer, Schenkman is the author of the children's book The Girl From Atlantis. He co-wrote the film, Went to Coney Island on a Mission from God… Be Back by Five, with Jon Cryer. He also wrote the screenplay for the TV film, A Diva's Christmas Carol.

== Awards and recognition ==
Schenkman won seven awards at film festivals such as the Austin Film Festival, Oldenburg International Film Festival, Rhode Island International Film Festival and WorldFest Flagstaff.

== Filmography ==
=== Film ===
Year	Film	Director	Writer	Producer	Notes	Reference(s)
1993	Angel IV: Assault with a Deadly Weapon	Yes	No	No	Credited as "George Axmith"	
1996	The Pompatus of Love	Yes	Yes	Co-producer	Also music supervisor	
1998	Went to Coney Island on a Mission from God... Be Back by Five	Yes	Yes	Yes		
1998	October 22	Yes	No	No		
2007	And Then Came Love	Yes	No	No		
2007	The Man from Earth	Yes	No	Yes	Also song lyrics "Forever"	
2012	Abraham Lincoln vs. Zombies	Yes	Yes	No		
2013	100 Degrees Below Zero	Yes	Yes	No		
2013	Mischief Night	Yes	Yes	Yes		
2015	I Spit on Your Grave III: Vengeance Is Mine	Yes	No	Co-executive		
2016	Hunt for Truth	Yes	Yes	No		
2017	The Man from Earth: Holocene	Yes	Yes	Yes		
2017	Dead on Arrival	Yes	No	No		
2019	Misfits	Yes	No	Yes	Unreleased	
2021	18 1/2	No	No	Executive		
2023	Anantha	No	No	Yes		
2023	Wineville	No	Yes	No		

=== Television ===
Year	Film	Director	Writer	Producer	Notes	Reference(s)
1984	1st Annual MTV Vídeo Music Awards	No	No	Yes		
1986	The SPIN New Music College Tour	Yes	No	Yes		
1987	SNAFU: The World's Screwiest Foul Ups!	Yes	Yes	Yes	Syndicated TV special	
1994	Lusty Liaisons	Segment Director	No	No	TV Anthology movie	
1994	Lusty Liaisons II	Segment Director	No	No	TV Anthology movie	
2000	A Diva's Christmas Carol	Yes	Yes	No	TV movie	
2006	Muckraker!	Yes	Yes	No	TV Short	
2007	Fawlty Towers	Yes	No	No	TV series Episode A Touch of Class	
2009	Flower Girl	No	Story	No	TV movie	
2012	Layover	Yes	No	No	TV movie	
2013	Zombie Night	No	Story	No	TV movie	
2016	A Father's Secret	Yes	Yes	No	TV movie	
