= Jungle Stories (magazine) =

American pulp magazine

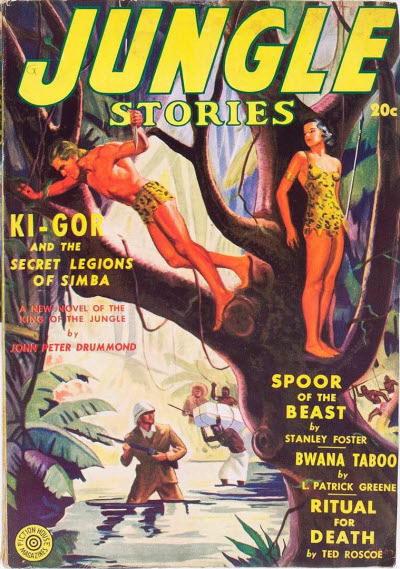
Cover of the Winter 1939 issue

Jungle Stories was an American pulp magazine published from 1938 to 1954. The lead stories featured the adventures of Ki-Gor, the son of a Scottish missionary raised in the jungle like Tarzan.

== Content ==
For the first two years, the main novels formed a continuous narrative, including Ki-Gor meeting Helene Vaughan, a pilot who crashes in the jungle and is saved by Ki-Gor; they later marry. After 1940, the novels were unconnected episodes featuring both of them fighting perils that included some science fictional tropes such as talking gorillas and dinosaurs.

The first novel was written by John M. Reynolds; all the later novels were listed under the house name "John Peter Drummond". Some of these were written by Stanley Mullen, but the authors of the others are unknown.

Short stories appeared alongside the lead novel in each issue, from authors including Wilbur S. Peacock, Duane Rimel, Dan Cushman, Bryce Walton, and E. Hoffmann Price. Jerome Bixby was an editor at the magazine from Fall 1949 to Spring 1951.

The magazine also featured a one-shot of Sheena, Queen of the Jungle in its final issue.

== Publishing history ==
Issue data for Jungle Stories
	Spring			Summer			Fall			Winter		
	Jan	Feb	Mar	Apr	May	Jun	Jul	Aug	Sep	Oct	Nov	Dec
1938										1/1		
1939				1/2			1/3			1/4		
1940	1/5			1/6			1/7			1/8		
1941	1/9			1/10			1/11			1/12		
1942	2/1			2/2			2/3			2/4		
1943		2/5		2/6	2/7		2/8			2/9		
1944	2/10			2/11			2/12			3/1		
1945	3/2			3/3			3/4			3/5		
1946	3/6			3/7			3/8			3/9		
1947	3/10			3/11			3/12			4/1		
1948	4/2			4/3			4/4			4/5		
1949	4/6			4/7			4/8			4/9		
1950	4/10			4/11			4/12			5/1		
1951	5/2						5/3			5/4		
1952	5/5						5/6			5/7		
1953	5/8						5/9			5/10		
1954	5/11											
Issues of Jungle Stories, showing volume and issue number. Underlining indicates that an issue was titled as a quarterly (e.g. "Fall 1949") rather than as a monthly.

Jungle Stories was published by Fiction House, and produced 59 issues between Winter 1938 and Spring 1954. It had a pulp format and 128 pages for all issues. The price began at 20 cents, rising to 25 cents with the Winter 1950 issue. There were four volumes of 12 numbers and a final volume with 11 numbers. It was initially quarterly, though there was no Spring 1939 issue, and there were two issues, dated February and April 1943, instead of a Spring 1943 issue. From 1951 to the end there was no Summer issue each year.

== Sources ==
- Weinberg, Robert (1985). "Jungle Stories". In Tymn, Marshall B.; Ashley, Mike (eds.). Science Fiction, Fantasy and Weird Fiction Magazines. Westport, Connecticut: Greenwood Press. pp. 365–366. ISBN 0-3132-1221-X.
