= Trick-or-treating =

Halloween tradition

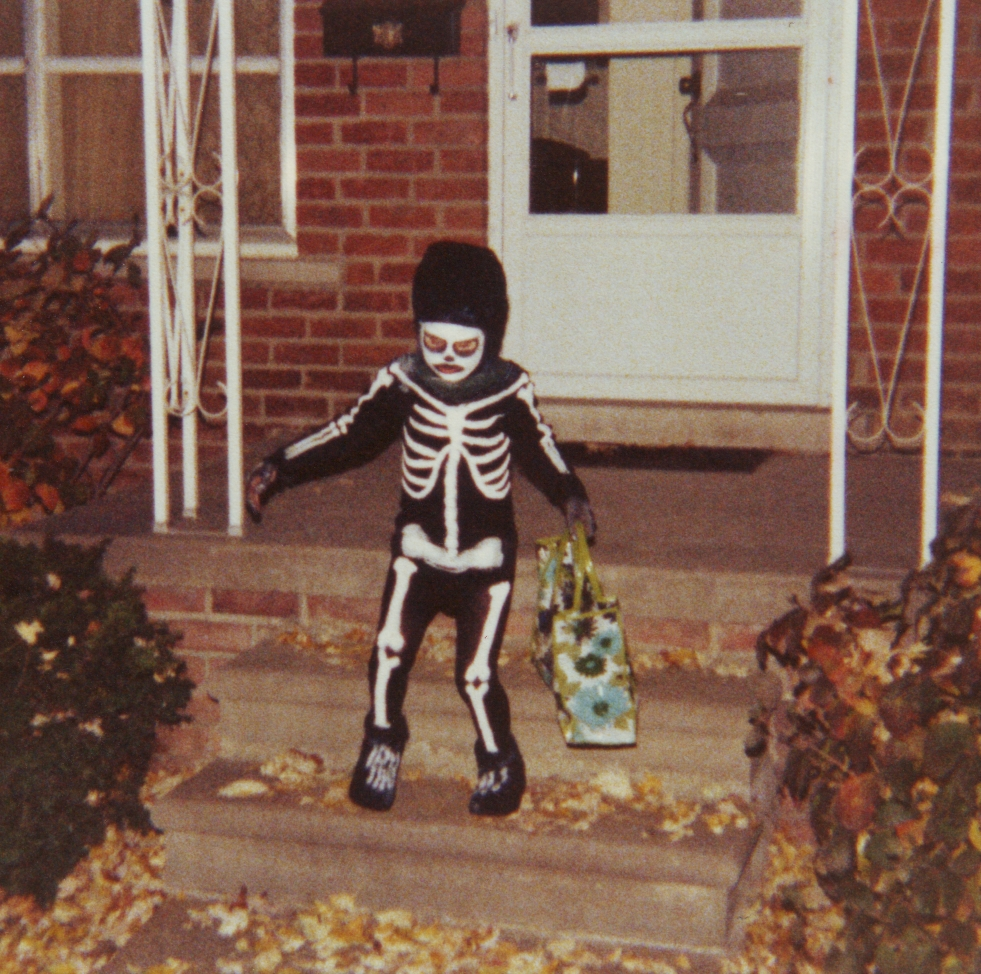
A child dressed as a skeleton trick-or-treating in Redford, Michigan, US, on October 31, 1979

Trick-or-treating is a traditional Halloween custom for children and adults in some countries. During the evening of Halloween, on the night between 31 October and 1 November, people in Halloween costumes travel from house to house, asking for treats with the phrase "trick or treat". The "treat" is some form of confectionery, usually candy/sweets, although in some cultures money is given instead. The "trick" refers to a threat, usually idle, to perform mischief on the resident(s) or their property if no treat is given. Some people signal that they are willing to hand out treats by putting up Halloween decorations outside their doors; houses may also leave their porch lights on as a universal indicator that they have candy; some simply leave treats available on their porches for the children to take freely, on the honor system.

The history of trick-or-treating traces back to Scotland and Ireland, where the tradition of guising, going house to house at Halloween and putting on a small performance to be rewarded with food or treats, goes back at least as far as the 16th century, as does the tradition of people wearing costumes at Halloween. There are many accounts from 19th-century Scotland and Ireland of people going house to house in costume at Halloween, reciting verses in exchange for food, and sometimes warning of misfortune if they were not welcomed. In North America, the earliest known occurrence of guising is from 1898, when children were recorded as having done this in the province of British Columbia, Canada. The interjection "trick or treat!" was then first recorded in the Canadian province of Ontario in 1917. While going house to house in costume has long been popular among the Scots and Irish, it is only in the 2000s that saying "trick or treat" has become common in Scotland and Ireland. Prior to this, children in Ireland would commonly say "help the Halloween party" at the doors of homeowners.

The activity is prevalent in the Anglospheric countries of the United Kingdom, Ireland, the United States and Canada. It also has extended into Mexico. In northwestern and central Mexico, the practice is called calaverita (Spanish diminutive for calavera, "skull" in English), and instead of "trick or treat", the children ask, "¿Me da mi calaverita?" ("[Can you] give me my little skull?"), where a calaverita is a small skull made of sugar or chocolate.

== History ==
=== Ancient precursors ===
Traditions similar to the modern custom of trick-or-treating extend all the way back to classical antiquity, although it is extremely unlikely that any of them are directly related to the modern custom. The ancient Greek writer Athenaeus of Naucratis records in his book The Deipnosophists that, in ancient times, the Greek island of Rhodes had a custom in which children would go from door-to-door dressed as swallows, singing a song, which demanded the owners of the house to give them food and threatened to cause mischief if the owners of the house refused. This tradition was claimed to have been started by the Rhodian lawgiver Cleobulus.

=== Medieval Christian era ===
==== Souling ====
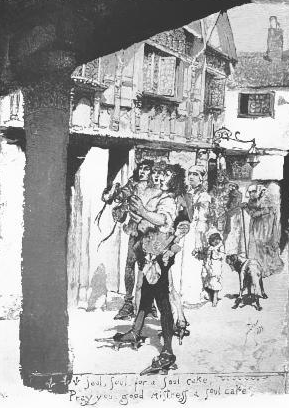
"A soul-cake, a soul-cake, have mercy on all Christian souls for a soul-cake" – a popular English souling rhyme

Starting as far back as the 15th century, among Christians, there had been a custom of sharing soul-cakes at Allhallowtide (October 31 through November 2). People would visit houses and take soul-cakes, either as representatives of the dead, or in return for praying for their souls. Later, people went "from parish to parish at Halloween, begging soul-cakes by singing under the windows some such verse as this: 'Soul, souls, for a soul-cake; Pray you good mistress, a soul-cake!'" They typically asked for "mercy on all Christian souls for a soul-cake". It was known as 'Souling' and was recorded in parts of Britain, Flanders, southern Germany, and Austria. William Shakespeare mentions the practice in his comedy The Two Gentlemen of Verona (1593), when Speed accuses his master of "puling [whimpering or whining] like a beggar at Hallowmas". In western England, mostly in the counties bordering Wales, souling was common. According to one 19th century English writer "parties of children, dressed up in fantastic costume […] went round to the farm houses and cottages, singing a song, and begging for cakes (spoken of as "soal-cakes"), apples, money, or anything that the goodwives would give them". In England, souling remained an important part of Allhallowtide observances until the 19th century, in both Protestant and Catholic areas.

The practice of giving and eating soul cakes continues in some countries today, such as Portugal (where it is known as Pão-por-Deus and occurs on All Hallows' Day and All Souls' Day), as well as the Philippines (where it is known as Pangangaluwa and occurs on All Hallows' Eve). In other countries, souling is seen as the origin of the practice of trick-or-treating. In the United States, some churches, during Allhallowtide, have invited people to come receive sweets from them and have offered to "pray for the souls of their friends, relatives or even pets" as they do so.

==== Mumming ====
Since the Middle Ages, a tradition of mumming on a certain holiday has existed in parts of Britain and Ireland. It involved going door-to-door in costume, performing short scenes or parts of plays in exchange for food or drink. The custom of trick-or-treating on Halloween may come from the belief that supernatural beings, or the souls of the dead, roamed the earth at this time and needed to be appeased.

=== Samhain ===
It may otherwise have originated in a Celtic festival, Samhain, held on 31 October–1 November, to mark the beginning of winter, in Ireland, Scotland and the Isle of Man, and Calan Gaeaf in Wales, Cornwall, and Brittany. The festival is believed to have pre-Christian roots. In the 9th century, the Catholic Church made 1 November All Saints' Day. Among Celtic-speaking peoples, it was seen as a liminal time, when the spirits or fairies (the Aos Sí), and the souls of the dead, came into our world and were appeased with offerings of food and drink. Similar beliefs and customs were found in other parts of Europe. It is suggested that trick-or-treating evolved from a tradition whereby people impersonated the spirits, or the souls of the dead, and received offerings on their behalf. S. V. Peddle suggests they "personify the old spirits of the winter, who demanded reward in exchange for good fortune". Impersonating these spirits or souls was also believed to protect oneself from them.

=== Guising ===
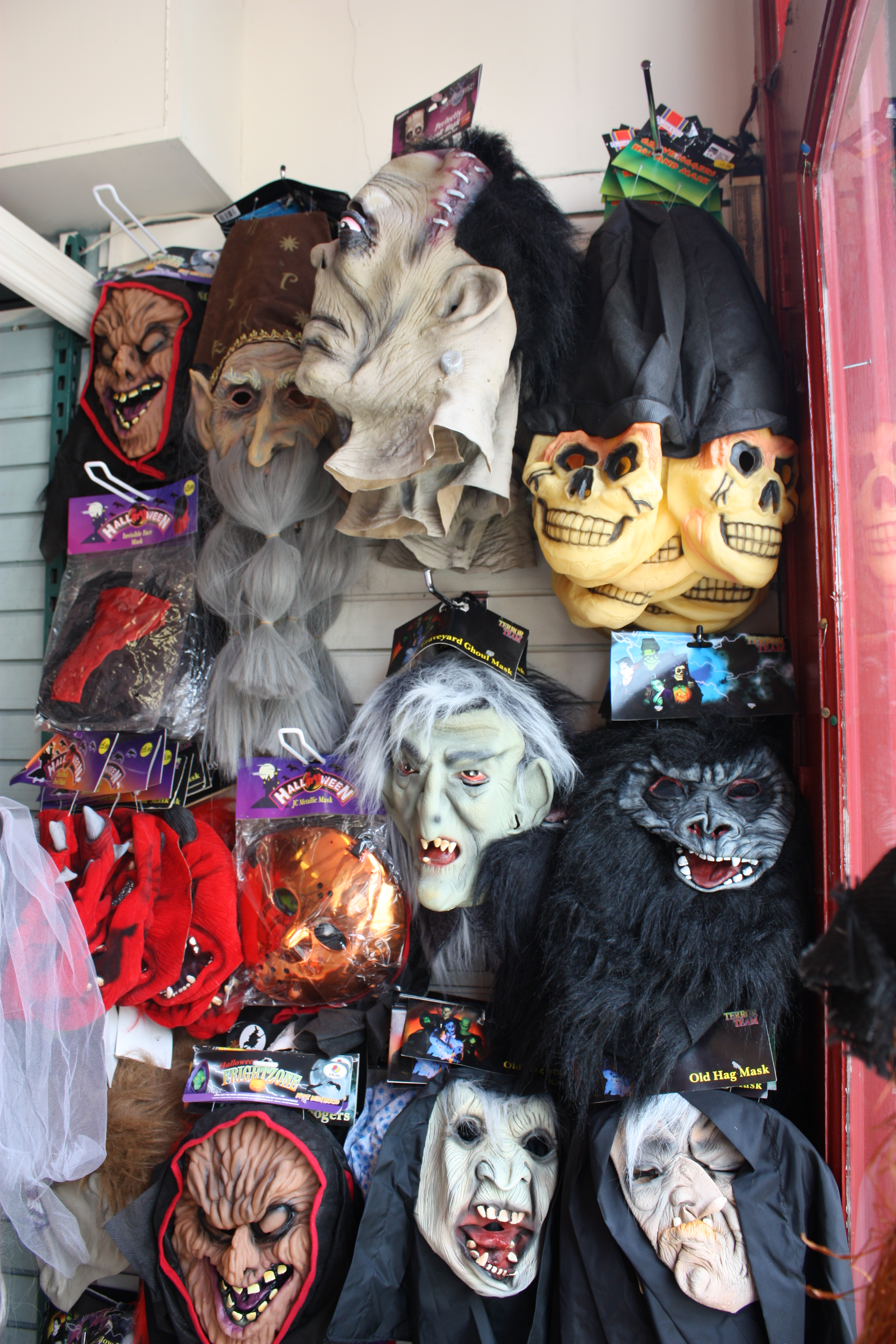
Halloween shop in Derry, Northern Ireland. Halloween masks are called 'false faces' in Ireland and Scotland.

In Scotland and Ireland, "guising" – children going from door to door in disguise – is secular, and a gift in the form of food, coins or "apples or nuts for the Halloween party" (and in more recent times, chocolate) is given out to the children. The tradition is called "guising" because of the disguises or costumes worn by the children. In the West Mid Scots dialect, guising is known as "galoshans". In Scotland, youths went house to house in white with masked, painted or blackened faces, reciting rhymes and often threatening to do mischief if they were not welcomed.

Guising has been recorded in Scotland since the 16th century, often at New Year. The Kirk Session records of Elgin name men and women who danced at New Year 1623. Six men, described as guisers or "gwysseris" performed a sword dance wearing masks and visors covering their faces in the churchyard and in the courtyard of a house. They were each fined 40 shillings.

A record of guising at Halloween in Scotland in 1895 describes masqueraders in disguise carrying lanterns made out of scooped out turnips, visiting homes to be rewarded with cakes, fruit, and money. In Ireland, children in costumes would commonly say "Help the Halloween Party" at the doors of homeowners.

Halloween masks are referred to as "false faces" in Ireland and Scotland. A writer using Scots language recorded guisers in Ayr, Scotland in 1890:

I had mind it was Halloween . . . the wee callans [boys] were at it already, rinning aboot wi' their fause-faces [false faces] on and their bits o' turnip lanthrons [lanterns] in their haun [hand].

Guising also involved going to wealthy homes, and in the 1920s, boys went guising at Halloween up to the affluent Thorntonhall, South Lanarkshire. An account of guising in the 1950s in Ardrossan, North Ayrshire, records a child receiving 12 shillings and sixpence, having knocked on doors throughout the neighbourhood and performed. Growing up in Derry, Northern Ireland in the 1960s, The Guardian journalist Michael Bradley recalls children asking, "Any nuts or apples?". In Scotland and Ireland, the children are only supposed to receive treats if they perform a party trick for the households they go to. This normally takes the form of singing a song or reciting a joke or a funny poem which the child has memorised before setting out. While going from door to door in disguise has remained popular among Scots and Irish at Halloween, the North American saying "trick-or-treat" has become common in the 2000s.

=== Spread to North America ===
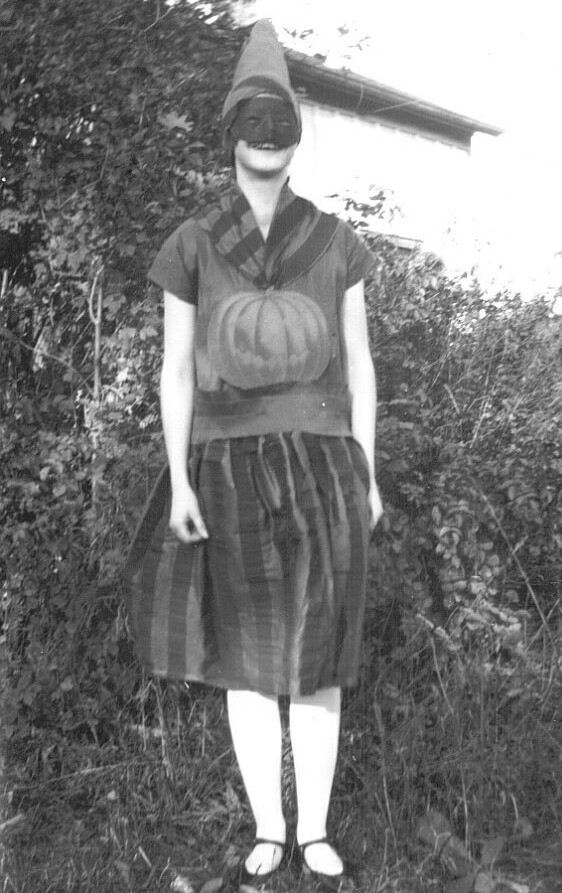
Girl in a Halloween costume in 1928 in Ontario, Canada, the same province where the Scottish Halloween custom of "guising" is first recorded in North America.

Author Nicholas Rogers cites an early example of guising in North America in 1911, where a newspaper in Kingston, Ontario, Canada, reported children going "guising" around the neighborhood. The article itself details the practice as such:

Between six and seven o'clock, the children began to appear in the streets, disguised with all kinds of masks and costumes. The usual programme of visiting the corner groecery stores, hotels and private residences was carried out, the youngesters efforts as elecutionists and vocalists being rewarded with money, apples, nuts, etc.

American historian and author Ruth Edna Kelley of Massachusetts wrote the first book length history of the holiday in the United States, The Book of Hallowe'en (1919), and references souling in the chapter "Hallowe'en in America": "The taste in Hallowe'en festivities now is to study old traditions, and hold a Scotch party, using Robert Burns's poem "Hallowe'en" as a guide; or to go a-souling as the English used. In short, no custom that was once honored at Hallowe'en is out of fashion now". Kelley lived in Lynn, Massachusetts, a town with 4,500 Irish immigrants, 1,900 English immigrants, and 700 Scottish immigrants in 1920. In her book, Kelley touches on customs that arrived from across the Atlantic: "Americans have fostered them, and are making this an occasion something like what it must have been in its best days overseas. All Hallowe'en customs in the United States are borrowed directly or adapted from those of other countries".

While the first reference to "guising" in North America occurs in 1911, another reference to ritual begging on Halloween appears, place unknown, in 1915, with a third reference in Chicago in 1920.

=== The interjection "Trick or treat!" ===
The interjection "Trick or treat!" – a request for sweets or candy, originally and sometimes still with the implication that anyone who is asked and who does not provide sweets or other treats will be subjected to a prank or practical joke – seems to have arisen in central Canada, before spreading into the northern and western United States in the 1930s and across the rest of the United States through the 1940s and early 1950s. Initially it was often found in variant forms, such as "tricks or treats", which was used in the earliest known case, a 1917 report in The Sault Daily Star in Sault Ste. Marie, Ontario:

Almost everywhere you went last night, particularly in the early part of the evening, you would meet gangs of youngsters out to celebrate. Some of them would have adopted various forms of "camouflage" such as masks, or would appear in long trousers and big hats or with long skirts. But others again didn't. . . . "Tricks or treats" you could hear the gangs call out, and if the householder passed out the "coin" for the "treats" his establishment would be immune from attack until another gang came along that knew not of or had no part in the agreement.

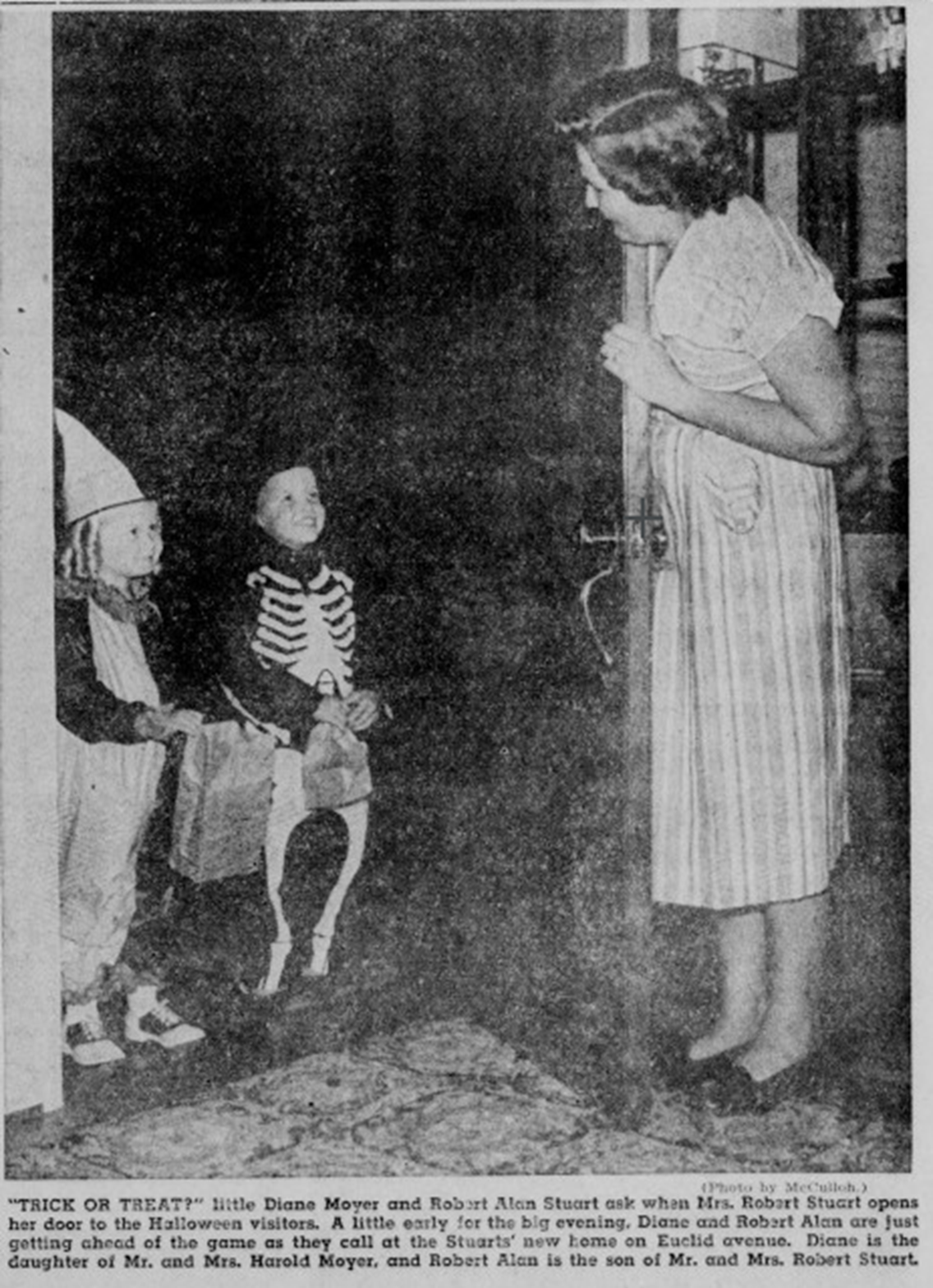
Newspaper clipping of kids trick-or-treating in Beaumont in 1950

As shown by word sleuth Barry Popik, who also found the first use from 1917, variant forms continued, with "trick or a treat" found in Chatsworth, Ontario in 1921, "treat up or tricks" and "treat or tricks" found in Edmonton, Alberta in 1922, and "treat or trick" in Penhold, Alberta in 1924. The now canonical form of "trick or treat" was first seen in 1917 in Chatsworth, only one day after the Sault Ste. Marie use, but "tricks or treats" was still in use in the 1966 television special, It's the Great Pumpkin, Charlie Brown.

The thousands of Halloween postcards produced between the start of the 20th century and the 1920s commonly show children but do not depict trick-or-treating. The editor of a collection of over 3,000 vintage Halloween postcards writes: "There are cards which mention the custom [of trick-or-treating] or show children in costumes at the doors, but as far as we can tell they were printed later than the 1920s and more than likely even the 1930s. Tricksters of various sorts are shown on the early postcards, but not the means of appeasing them".

Trick-or-treating does not seem to have become a widespread practice until the 1930s, with the first appearance in the United States of the term in 1928, and the first known use in a national publication occurring in 1939.

Behavior similar to trick-or-treating was more commonly associated with Thanksgiving from 1870 (shortly after that holiday's formalization) until the 1930s. In New York City, a Thanksgiving ritual known as Ragamuffin Day involved children dressing up as beggars and asking for treats, which later evolved into dressing up in more diverse costumes. Increasing hostility toward the practice in the 1930s eventually led to the begging aspects being dropped, and by the 1950s, the tradition as a whole had ceased.

=== Increased popularity ===
Almost all pre-1940 uses of the term "trick-or-treat" are from the United States and Canada. Trick-or-treating spread throughout the United States, stalled only by World War II sugar rationing that began in April 1942 and lasted until June 1947.

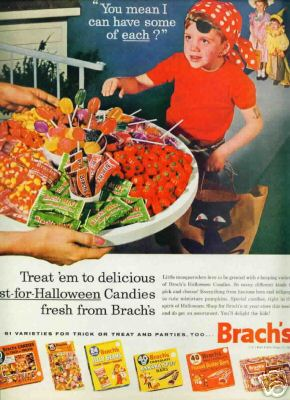
Magazine advertisement in 1962

Early national attention to trick-or-treating was given in October 1947 issues of the children's magazines Jack and Jill and Children's Activities, and by Halloween episodes of the network radio programs The Baby Snooks Show in 1946 and The Jack Benny Show and The Adventures of Ozzie and Harriet in 1948. Trick-or-treating was depicted in the Peanuts comic strip in 1951. The custom had become firmly established in popular culture by 1952, when Walt Disney portrayed it in the cartoon Trick or Treat, and Ozzie and Harriet were besieged by trick-or-treaters on an episode of their television show. In 1953 UNICEF first conducted a national campaign for children to raise funds for the charity while trick-or-treating.

Although some popular histories of Halloween have characterized trick-or-treating as an adult invention to re-channel Halloween activities away from Mischief Night vandalism, there are very few records supporting this. Des Moines, Iowa is the only area known to have a record of trick-or-treating being used to deter crime. Elsewhere, adults, as reported in newspapers from the mid-1930s to the mid-1950s, typically saw it as a form of extortion, with reactions ranging from bemused indulgence to anger. Likewise, as portrayed on radio shows, children would have to explain what trick-or-treating was to puzzled adults, and not the other way around. Sometimes even the children protested: for Halloween 1948, members of the Madison Square Boys Club in New York City carried a parade banner that read "American Boys Don't Beg". The National Confectioners Association reported in 2005 that 80 percent of adults in the United States planned to give out confectionery to trick-or-treaters, and that 93 percent of children, teenagers, and young adults planned to go trick-or-treating or participating in other Halloween activities.

=== Phrase introduction to the United Kingdom and Ireland ===
Despite the concept of trick-or-treating originating in Britain and Ireland in the form of souling and guising, the use of the term "trick or treat" at the doors of homeowners was not common until the 1980s, with its popularisation in part through the release of the film E.T. Guising requires those going door-to-door to perform a song or poem without any jocular threat, and according to one BBC journalist, in the 1980s, "trick or treat" was still often viewed as an exotic and not particularly welcome import, with the BBC referring to it as "the Japanese knotweed of festivals" and "making demands with menaces". In Ireland before the phrase "trick or treat" became common in the 2000s, children would say "Help the Halloween Party". Very often, the phrase "trick or treat" is simply said and the revellers are given sweets, with the choice of a trick or a treat having been discarded.

== Etiquette ==
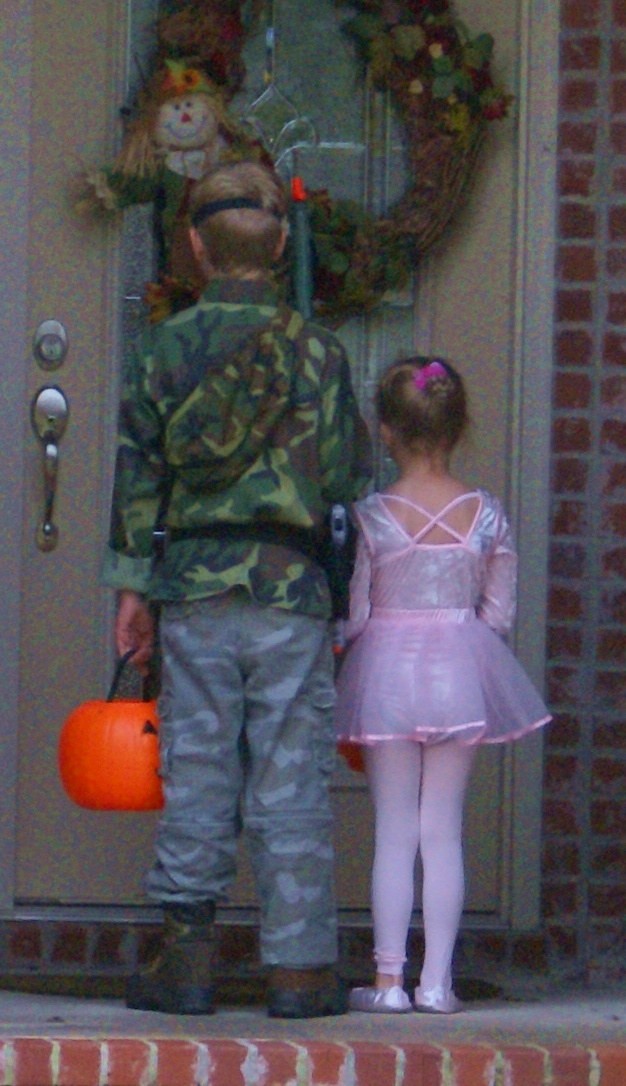
Two children trick-or-treating on Halloween in Arkansas, United States in 2007

Trick-or-treating typically begins at dusk on October 31. Some municipalities choose other dates. Homeowners wishing to participate sometimes decorate their homes with artificial spider webs, plastic skeletons and jack-o'-lanterns. Conversely, those who do not wish to participate may turn off outside lights for the evening or lock relevant gates and fences to keep people from coming onto their property.

In most areas where trick-or-treating is practiced, it is considered an activity for children. Some jurisdictions in the United States forbid the activity for anyone over the age of 12. Dressing up is common at all ages; adults will often dress up to accompany their children, and young adults may dress up to go out and ask for gifts for a charity.

== Local variants ==
=== United States and Canada ===
Children of both the St. Louis, Missouri, and Des Moines, Iowa, areas are expected to perform a joke, usually a simple Halloween-themed pun or riddle, before receiving any candy; this "trick" earns the "treat". In addition, trick-or-treating in the Des Moines area is arranged on a different night preceding Halloween, known as Beggar's night, with the expectation it will reduce mischief and keep children safer from adult parties and drunk driving that may occur on Halloween proper.

In some parts of Canada, children sometimes say "Halloween apples" instead of "trick or treat". This probably originated when the toffee apple was a popular type of candy. Apple-giving in much of Canada, however, has been taboo since the 1960s when stories (of almost certainly questionable authenticity) appeared of razors hidden inside Halloween apples; parents began to check over their children's fruit for safety before allowing them to eat it. In Quebec, children also go door to door on Halloween, but in French-speaking neighbourhoods, instead of "Trick or treat", they will simply say "Halloween", though it traditionally used to be "La charité, s'il-vous-plaît" ("Charity, please").

==== Trunk-or-treat ====
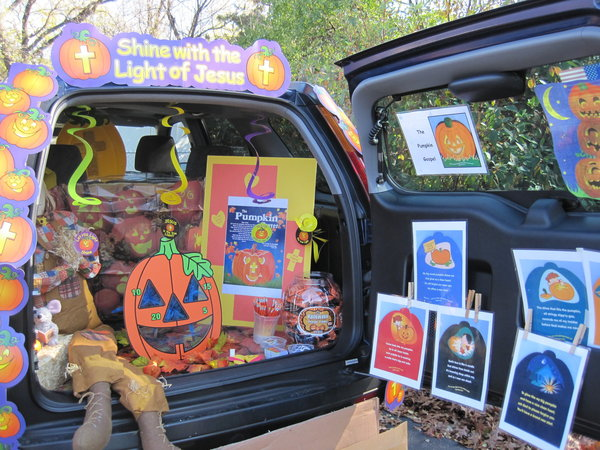
Trunk-or-treating event held at St. John Lutheran Church & Early Learning Center in Darien, Illinois

Some organizations around the United States and Canada sponsor a "trunk-or-treat" on Halloween night (or, on occasion, a day immediately preceding Halloween, or a few days from it, on a weekend, depending on what is convenient). Trunk-or-treating is done from parked car to parked car in a local parking lot, often at a school or church. The activity makes use of the open trunks of the cars, which display candy, and often games and decorations. Some parents regard trunk-or-treating as a safer alternative to trick-or-treating, while other parents see it as an easier alternative to walking the neighborhood with their children.

This annual event began in the mid-1990s as a "fall festival" for an alternative to trick-or-treating, but became "trunk-or-treat" two decades later. This change was primarily due to "discomfort with some of Halloween's themes". Some churches and church leaders have attempted to connect with the cultural phenomenon of Halloween, viewing it as an opportunity for cultural engagement with the Gospel, but some have called for more city or community group-sponsored trunk-or-treats, so they can be more inclusive. By 2006 these had become increasingly popular.

=== Portugal and Iberian Peninsula ===
In Portugal, children go from house to house on All Saints Day and All Souls Day, carrying pumpkin carved lanterns called coca, asking everyone they see for Pão-por-Deus singing rhymes where they remind people why they are begging, saying "...It is for me and for you, and to give to the deceased who are dead and buried" or "It is to share with your deceased" In the Azores the bread given to the children takes the shape of the top of a skull. The tradition of pão-por-Deus was already recorded in the 15th century. In Galicia, particularly in the island of A Illa de Arousa, a similar tradition exists where children ask for alms (usually bread, sweets, fruits, chestnuts, money or small toys) with the phrase "unha esmoliña polos defuntiños que van alá" ("a little charity for the little deceased who are there").

=== Scandinavia ===
In Sweden, children dress up as witches and monsters when they go trick-or-treating on Maundy Thursday (the Thursday before Easter) while Danish and Faroese children dress up in various attires and go trick-or-treating on Fastelavn (or the next day, Shrove Monday). In Norway, the practice is quite common among children, who come dressed up to people's doors asking for, mainly, candy. The Easter witch tradition is done on Palm Sunday in Finland (virvonta).

=== Elsewhere in Europe ===
In parts of Flanders, some parts of the Netherlands, and most areas of Germany, Switzerland, and Austria, children go to houses with home-made beet lanterns or with paper lanterns (which can hold a candle or electronic light), singing songs about St. Martin on St. Martin's Day (the 11th of November), in return for treats. Over the last decade, Halloween trick-or-treating has experienced a notable surge in popularity, particularly among children and teenagers in Germany. Austria and the Netherlands have also witnessed a similar trend. The equivalent of 'trick-or-treat' in the German language is 'Süßes oder Saures', which translates to asking for sweets or threatening something less pleasant, with the direct translation being "sweet or sour".

In Northern Germany and Southern Denmark, children dress up in costumes and go trick-or-treating on New Year's Eve in a tradition called "Rummelpott". Rummelpott has experienced a massive decrease in popularity over recent decades, although some towns and communities are trying to revive it.

== Trick-or-treat for charity ==
UNICEF started a program in 1950 called Trick-or-Treat for UNICEF in which trick-or-treaters ask people to give money for the organization, usually instead of collecting candy. Participating trick-or-treaters say when they knock at doors "Trick-or-treat for UNICEF!" This program started as an alternative to candy. The organization has long produced disposable collection boxes that state on the back what the money can be used for in developing countries.

In Canada, students from the local high schools, colleges, and universities dress up to collect food donations for the local food banks as a form of trick-or-treating. This is sometimes called "Trick-or-Eat".

== See also ==
- Sweetest Day
- Poisoned candy myths
- Hop-tu-Naa
- Koledovanie
- Virvonta
- Ben Cooper, Inc.
