= Ben Cooper (company) =

Halloween costume manufacturer

Ben Cooper, Inc.
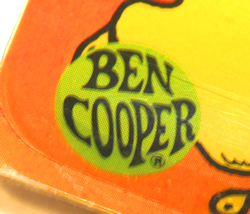
- Type: Privately held
- Founded: 1937
- Founder: Ben Cooper, Sr.
- Defunct: 1992
- Headquarters: Brooklyn, New York (1937-1991); Greensboro, North Carolina (1991-1992)
- Area served: United States
- Products: Halloween costumes, Toys

Ben Cooper, Inc. was a privately held American corporation founded in 1937 which primarily manufactured Halloween costumes from the late 1930s to the late 1980s. It was one of the three largest Halloween costume manufacturers in the U.S. from the 1950s through the mid-1980s. The company's inexpensive plastic masks and vinyl smocks were an iconic American symbol of Halloween from the 1950s to the 1970s, for which Cooper has been called the "Halston of Halloween" and the "High Priest" of Halloween.

== Corporate history ==
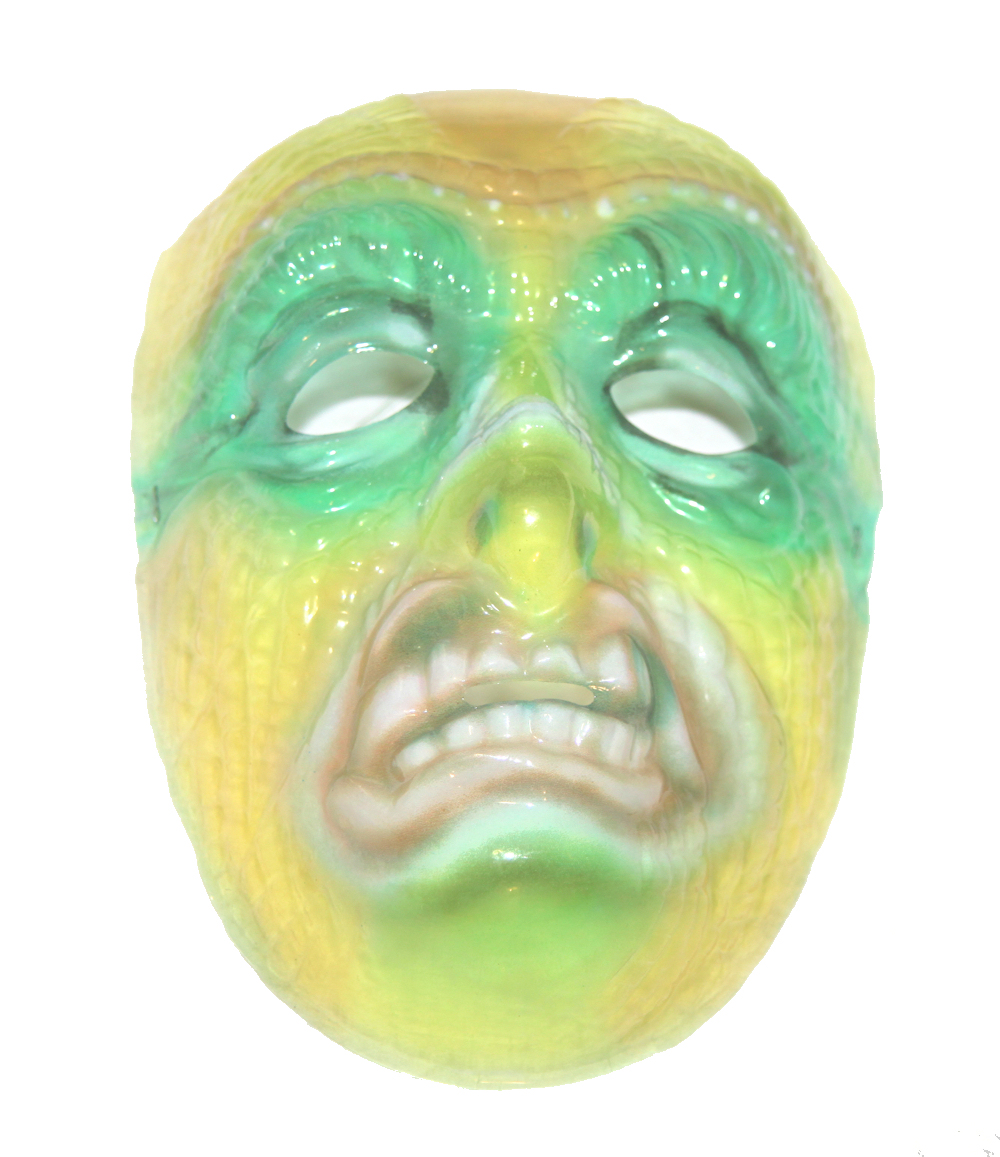
A translucent Halloween mummy mask sold by Ben Cooper, Inc. in the 1960s.

Founder Ben Cooper was born on the Lower East Side of New York City in 1906. He studied accounting and briefly sought a career as a songwriter before founding a theatrical costume business in 1927. Cooper designed costumes and sets for the legendary Cotton Club in Harlem and several editions of the Ziegfeld Follies.

With live theatre becoming rarer in the 1930s due to the Great Depression and Halloween becoming a more popular holiday, Cooper established Ben Cooper, Inc., in Brooklyn, New York, in 1937. The firm assumed control of A.S. Fishbach, Inc.—which had a license to produce costumes based on characters owned by The Walt Disney Company such as Donald Duck and Snow White—in 1937 and began selling Disney costumes under Fishbach's Spotlight brand. The two companies formally merged and incorporated as Ben Cooper, Inc., on December 8, 1942.

By the late 1940s, Ben Cooper, Inc. was one of the largest and most prominent Halloween costume manufacturers in the United States. Its costumes were generally very thin fabric with a silk-screened image on the front that sold for less than $3. The company began selling its costumes through large retailers such as J. C. Penney, Sears, Woolworth's, and five-and-dime stores. Costumes often sold for $1.25 ($18 in 2025 dollars). At the time, the most popular costumes were traditional Halloween figures such as devils, ghosts, skeletons, and witches. In the 1950s, television characters such as Davy Crockett, Superman, and Zorro were more popular. As parents became more concerned about safety in the 1950s, the company responded by creating its "Glitter Glo" costumes, dresses, and jumpsuits with large amounts of blue glitter glued to the front (which would reflect the headlights of oncoming automobiles). The company banked heavily on the popularity of President John F. Kennedy and Jacqueline Kennedy, but had to destroy thousands of masks after Kennedy was assassinated in November 1963.

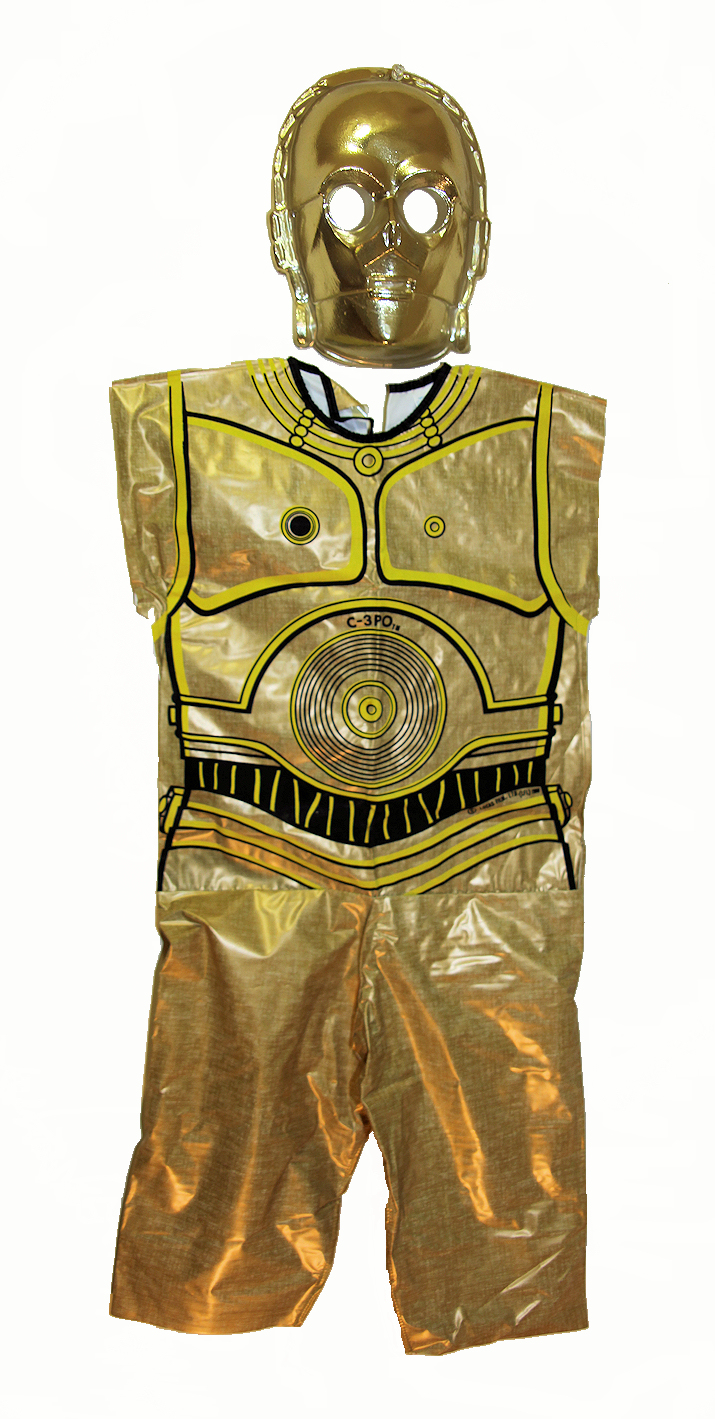
A 1977 Ben Cooper costume and mask manufactured of the character C-3PO from the Star Wars films

In the 1960s and 1970s, Ben Cooper, Inc., was one of the "big three" Halloween costume companies, along with Collegeville and the H. Halpern Company (Halco). The company became known for licensing popular film and television characters and getting their images onto store shelves quickly. For example, it licensed Spider-Man, a virtually unknown character at the time, in 1963. The company also licensed the Batman character in 1964. The company was the first to license anything depicting Marvel superheroes.

The company produced a very popular Richard Nixon mask in the late 1960s, which sold as equally well as its Ronald Reagan mask even in the late 1980s. The company produced a George H. W. Bush mask in 1987, anticipating Bush's election as president by a year. In 1979, Ben Cooper, Inc., was still the largest Halloween costume company in the U.S. That same year, the firm issued its first costume based on a character in an R-rated motion picture, the creature from the film Alien.

The company suffered heavy financial losses in the early and mid-1980s. Beginning on September 29, 1982, seven people died after taking the painkiller Tylenol. Investigators discovered that someone had tampered with the product, lacing it with potassium cyanide. Terrified parents nationwide refused to allow their children to celebrate Halloween the following month, and sales of costumes plummeted and did not recover for several years. Ben Cooper, Inc. formed the Halloween Celebration Committee along with eight other manufacturers of Halloween costumes, masks, makeup, and accessories and (in cooperation with the Toy Manufacturers of America) published the booklet "13 Great Ways to Celebrate Halloween" in order to reassure parents and help stimulate interest in the holiday again. Despite this setback, in 1984 the firm was still the largest supplier of Halloween costumes in the United States. The company recovered around 1987, as total sales of accessories, costumes, and makeup rose at an annual rate of 20 percent a year.

A 2024 documentary by Rob Caprilozzi, Dressing Up Halloween: The Story of Ben Cooper, Inc. traces the firm's corporate history. In it, the son of costume designer Frank Romano, states that the reason that the costumes had an image of the character on the front was that children often moved the sweat-inducing masks off their faces and wore them atop their heads and the licensing agreements required that the characters always be recognizable.

== Toys ==
Apart from Halloween costumes, Ben Cooper's other major venture was toys, primarily of the rack toy variety. In 1974, they made Planet of the Apes jigglers, sold loose in a counter box. In 1975, they made Shark!, a rubber shark with a rubber man clearly inspired by the popularity of Jaws, for which Imperial Toy Corporation had the actual license. In 1980, they produced a set of "Marvel Super Heroes Action Figures," which were also flexible, non-articulated "jigglers," depicting Spider-Man, The Thing, Doctor Strange, and the evil Red Skull, the latter two possibly appearing as toys for the first time. They were sold loose from a counter display box.

== Bankruptcies and sale ==
The increasing sales in the late 1980s were not enough to stave off bankruptcy, however. Ben Cooper, Inc.'s financial problems became so severe in 1988 that many customers left the firm and diverted licenses and business to its biggest competitor, Collegeville. The company filed for Chapter 11 bankruptcy on March 13, 1988. As a privately held company, little financial data was available on its profit margins. However, one press report estimated the firm's profit margin below 10 percent in 1989. On January 6, 1989, the company's facility in Georgia burned to the ground, destroying (the company said) $2 million to $3 million in inventory ($5 million to $8 million in 2025 dollars). Cooper's two insurance companies canceled coverage of the firm and refused to pay, citing inaccuracies in the insurance policy. The bankruptcy court refused to consider Cooper's claims against the insurance companies. Cooper appealed the court's ruling.

Ben Cooper, Inc. emerged from bankruptcy in April 1989 after paying all its creditors in full.

The United States Court of Appeals for the Second Circuit determined in February 1990 that the issue of the insurance coverage was "core" and thus should be heard by the bankruptcy court. One of the insurance companies appealed to the Supreme Court of the United States. In a per curiam decision, the Supreme Court held that a serious jurisdictional issue had been brought to the court's attention by legal briefs, forcing it to vacate the appellate court's decision, remanding the case back to the appellate court, and asking the appellate court to consider the jurisdictional issue. The 2nd Circuit Court of Appeals considered the jurisdictional issue, found in Cooper's favor, and reinstated its original ruling in January 1991.

Just days after the appellate court's second ruling, executives of Ben Cooper, Inc. announced they were moving the company to Greensboro, North Carolina. The company said at this time that it had 35 permanent employees, and manufactured and supplied more than 4 million costumes in the previous year. It said it controlled 70 to 80 percent of the licensed costume character costume business, and was partnered with companies such as Children's Television Workshop (producers of Sesame Street), DC Comics, Mattel, and Walt Disney Studios. It said the reason for the move was to be closer to Southern textile factories and cutting shops, so that it could move away from the environmentally harmful vinyl costumes it had obtained from Asia and toward more acceptable natural fabrics. The company hoped to invest $6 million ($14,182,751) in building its new Greensboro facility, and said it would apply for a $600,000 Community Development Block Grant to help defray costs and provide jobs to low-income workers in the area.

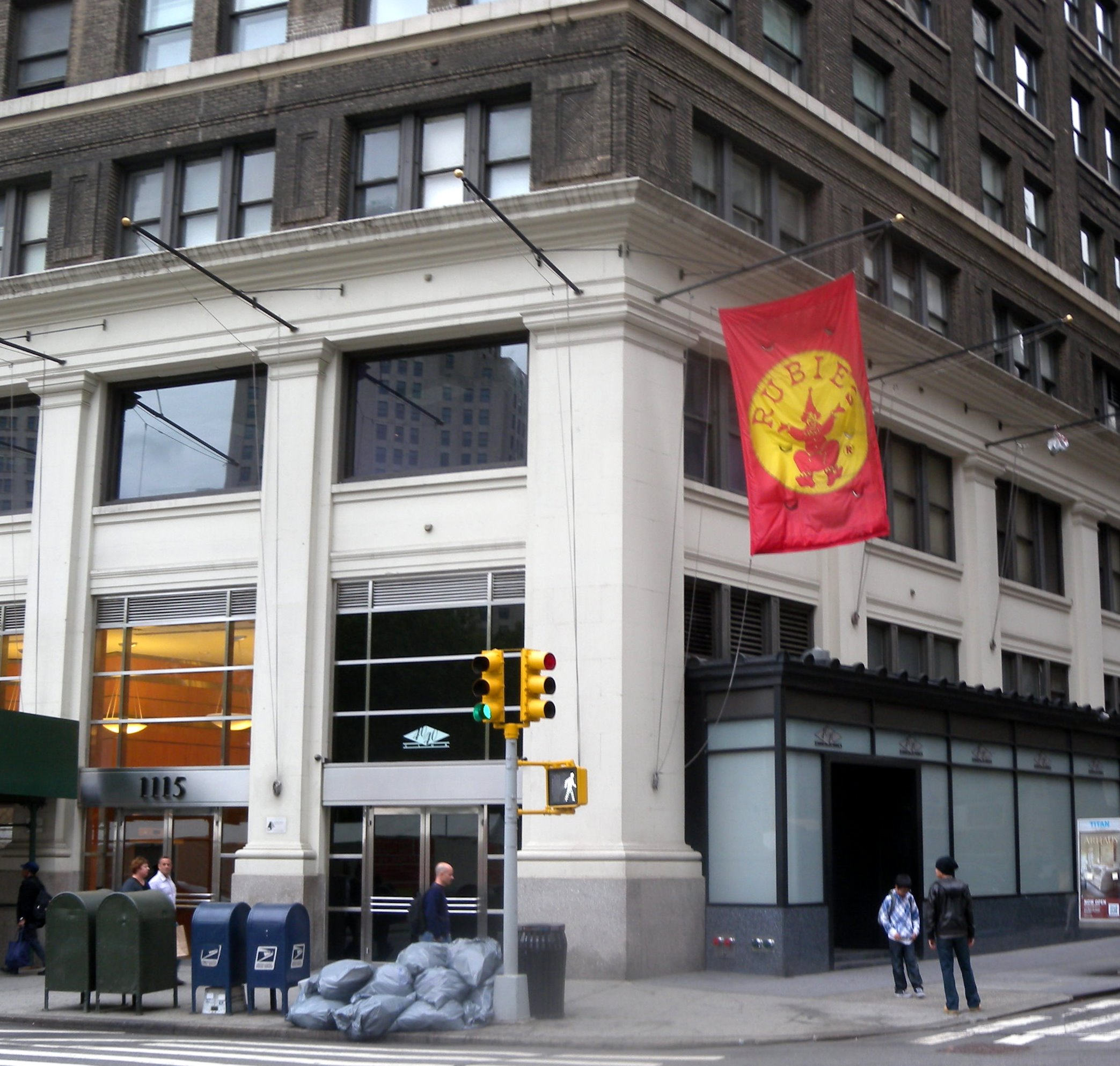
Rubie's Costume Co

On October 30, 1991, Ben Cooper, Inc. filed for Chapter 11 bankruptcy yet again. The company's chief executive officer said the cause of the second bankruptcy was due to relocation expenses, the early 1990s recession, and delays in obtaining bank loans. The company was not able to survive as an independent firm, however, and was bought by Rubie's Costume Co. in 1992.

== Collectibility ==
Products made by Ben Cooper, Inc. remain highly collectible. Collectors prize the boxed costumes with mask the most. In 2002, photographer Phyllis Galembo published Dressed for Thrills: 100 Years of Halloween Costumes & Masquerade, a book of text and photography which features some of the costumes produced by Ben Cooper, Inc.

== Bibliography ==
- "Antiques and Collectibles." The Bergen Record. October 31, 2002.
- "Ben Cooper Files to Reorganize in Chapter 11." Daily News Record. March 14, 1988.
- "Chalkware Owl Could Bring As Much As $20." Spokane Spokesman-Review. June 11, 2004.
- "Cooper Agrees to Pay Unsecured Creditors 100%." Daily News Record. October 26, 1988.
- DeCaro, Frank. "Grown-Up Goblins: Halloween Fantasies Let the Ghoul Times Roll for Stressed Out Baby Boomers." Chicago Tribune. October 25, 1987.
- Everhart, Jane. "Halloween: A Family Business." Selling Halloween. February 2007.
- Fendelman, Helaine. "Vintage Halloween Costumes." Country Living. October 1, 2007.
- Fricker, Dan. "Raisins Are Sweet for Costume Maker." The Morning Call. October 26, 1988.
- Galembo, Phyllis. Dressed for Thrills: 100 Years of Halloween Costumes and Masquerade. New York: Harry N. Abrams, 2002.
- "Ghoul Gear." The Village Voice. October 25–31, 1973.
- "Halloween Costume." In Encyclopedia of Clothing and Fashion. Valerie Steele, ed. New York: Charles Scribner's Sons, 2004.
- "Halloween Costumes May Scare Up Profits." The Charlotte Observer. June 1, 1995.
- Kita, Joe. "Just Needle and Thread Create Stuff of Dreams — and Nightmares." The Morning Call. October 25, 1984.
- Kleinfeld, N.R. "The Weird, the Bad and the Scary." New York Times. October 15, 1989.
- Kovel, Terry. "Scaring Up Containers." Virginian-Pilot. October 26, 2008.
- Kovel, Ralph and Kovel, Terry. "Antiques and Collectibles." Monterey County Herald. October 22, 2005.
- Kovel, Ralph and Kovel, Terry. "Comfort Helped 'Sleeping Chair' Take Wing." Dallas Morning News. November 5, 1996.
- Kovel, Ralph and Kovel, Terry. "Ghoulish Goings-On." Atlanta Journal and Constitution. October 27, 1995.
- Kovel, Ralph and Kovel, Terry. "It's Hard to Put a Price Tag on One-of-a-Kind Folk Art." Florida Times-Union. October 19, 1996.
- Kovel, Ralph and Kovel, Terry. "Pop-Up Books and Toys Entertain for Centuries." Albany Times Union. October 28, 2007.
- Lesem, Jeanne. "Booklet Aims to Make '83 Halloween Trick-or-Treat Both Scary and Safe." United Press International. October 4, 1983.
- "Major Bankruptcy Ruling Stands." Business Insurance. June 3, 1991.
- McLaughlin, Patricia. "Costumes' Popularity Is Absolutely Batty." St. Louis Post-Dispatch. October 26, 1989.
- Miller, Laura (October 30, 2002). "Mask Oriented". Salon. Archived from the original on October 26, 2012.
- Moody, Sid. "Television Land Outside Your Door." The Hartford Courant. October 30, 1960.
- Petty, Ross D. "The 'Amazing Adventures' of Super Hero®." The Trademark Reporter. 100:3 (May–June 2010).
- Rinker, Harry. "Halloween Costumes Worth Scaring Up By Collectors." The Morning Call. November 10, 1996.
- Rinker, Harry. "Unmasking the Value of Old Halloween Costumes." The Morning Call. October 23, 2007.
- Rosenkrantz, Linda. "Chills and Thrills Have Long History." San Diego Union-Tribune. October 20, 2002.
- Sandstrom, Karen. "Frightfully Collectible." The Plain Dealer. October 28, 1994.
- Scism, Jack. "Bankruptcy Repeat No Treat for Costume Manufacturer." Greensboro News-Record. October 31, 1991.
- Scism, Jack. "Court Lets Costume Firm Seek Jury Trial On Claim." Greensboro News-Record. May 16, 1991.
- Scism, Jack. "Greensboro Gains New Jobs As Costume Maker Relocates." Greensboro News-Record. January 8, 1991.
- Shapiro, Harriet. "Trick and Treat! Ben Cooper Bags Millions as the Halston of Halloween." People. October 29, 1979.
- "Snow White Costumes By Fishbach." Playthings. June 1938.
- Szadkowski, Joseph. "New Superheroes Suit Up With Halloween Standards." The Washington Times. October 11, 2003.
- "Trick-or-Treating as Buck Rogers." Los Angeles Times. October 28, 2000.
- Yvaska, Steven Wayne. "Spirited Noisemakers." San Jose Mercury News. October 29, 2005.
