= Halloween costume =

Costumes worn on or around Halloween

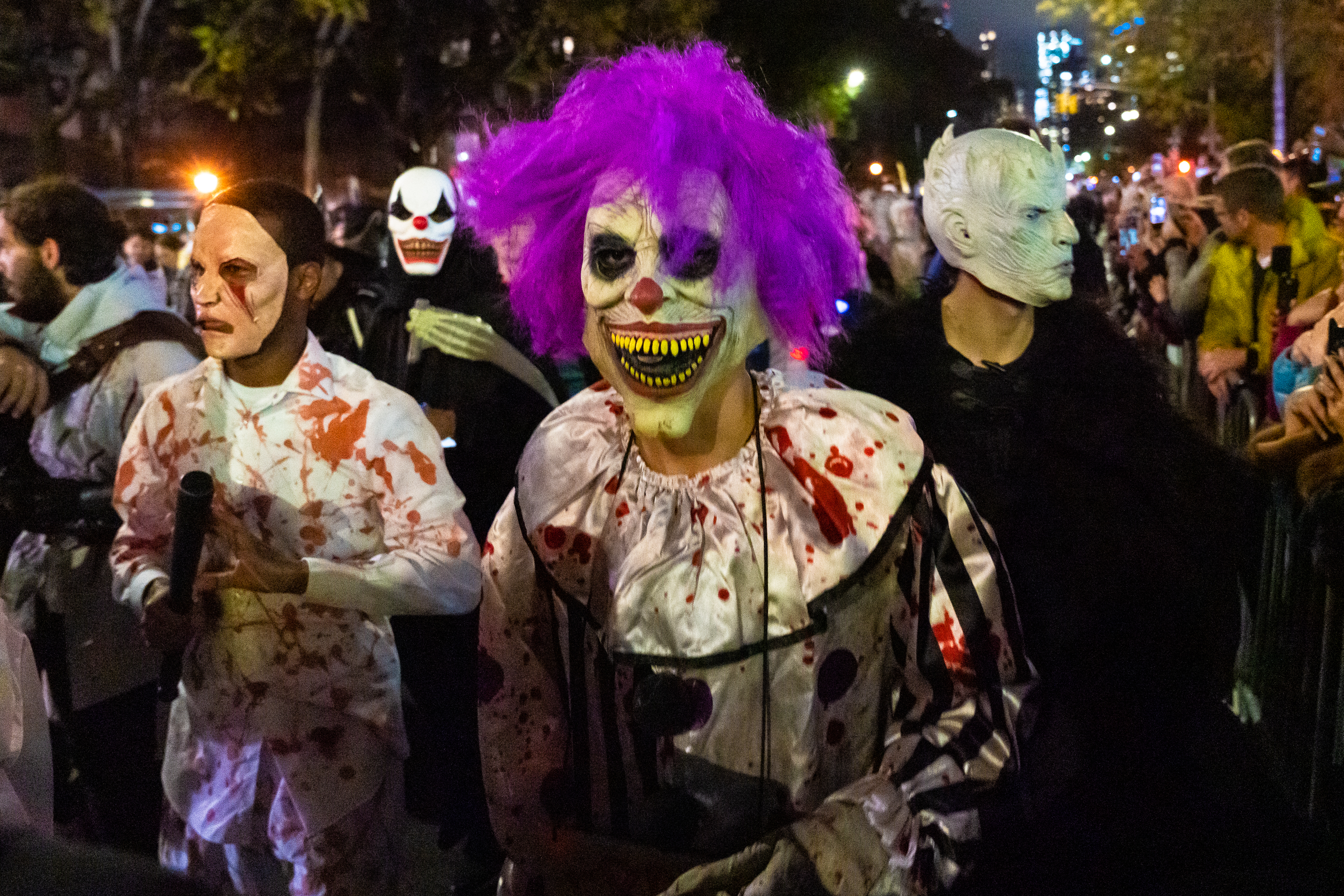
Costumes at the 2019 New York City Halloween Parade

Halloween costumes are costumes worn on Halloween, typically while trick-or-treating (going door to door to ask for treats). Although traditionally based on frightening supernatural or folkloric beings, by the 1930s costumes based on characters from mass media—such as film, literature, and radio—gained popularity. Halloween costumes have traditionally been worn mainly by young people, but since the mid-20th century increasingly by adults as well.

== Historical roots ==
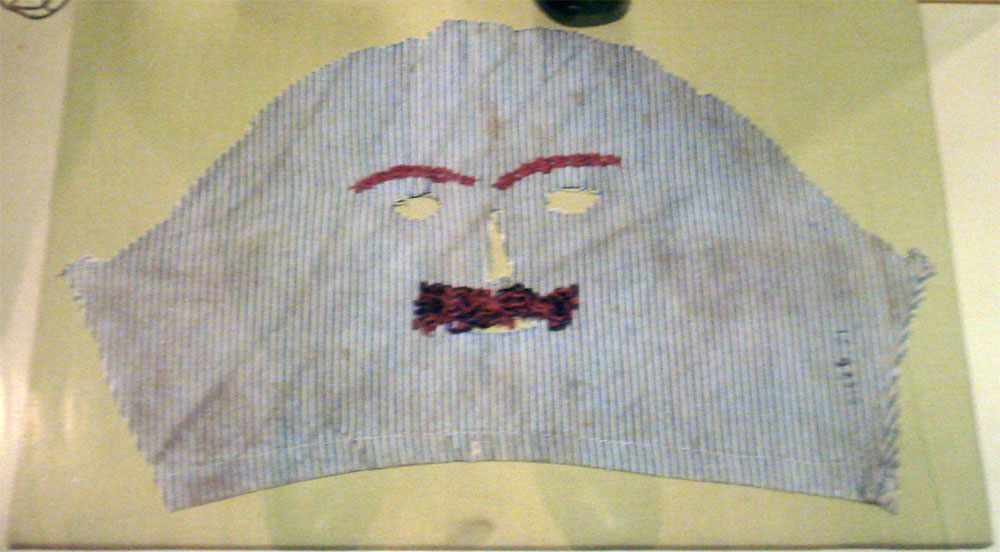
An early 20th-century Irish Halloween mask (a "rhymer" or "vizor"), displayed at the Museum of Country Life in Ireland.

The custom of wearing Halloween costumes may have originated in a Celtic festival held on October 31 to mark the beginning of winter, at which costumes were worn to ward off evil spirits. Called Samhain in Ireland and Scotland and on the Isle of Man, but Calan Gaeaf in Wales, Cornwall, and Brittany, the festival is believed to have pre-Christian roots. After the Christianization of Ireland in the 5th century, some of these customs may have been retained in the Christian observance of All Hallows' Eve in that region. Although the festival continued to be called Samhain and Calan Gaeaf, it blended ancient traditions with Christian ones. The time of year was seen as liminal, when spirits or fairies (the Aos Sí) and the souls of the dead could more easily come to the world of the living.

From at least the 16th century, the festival included mumming and guising, which involved people going door to door in costume or disguise and usually reciting verses or songs in exchange for food. Originally, people may have impersonated the Aos Sí or the souls of the dead to receive offerings on their behalf. Impersonating these beings or wearing a disguise was also believed to protect oneself from them. It has also been suggested that the mummers and guisers "personify the old spirits of the winter, who demanded reward in exchange for good fortune". F. Marian McNeill suggests the ancient pagan festival included people wearing masks or costumes to represent the spirits, and that faces were marked or blackened with ashes from the sacred bonfire.

In parts of southern Ireland, a man dressed as a láir bhán or white mare led youths house to house reciting verses—some with pagan overtones—in exchange for food. If the household gave food, it could expect good fortune, whereas not doing so would bring misfortune. Similarly, in 19th-century England, youths went house to house with masked, painted, or blackened faces, often threatening to do mischief if they were not welcomed.

In parts of Wales, men went about dressed as fearsome beings called gwrachod, while in some places, young people cross-dressed.

Although mumming and costumes were part of other yearly festivals elsewhere in Europe, in Celtic-speaking regions, they were "particularly appropriate to a night upon which supernatural beings were said to be abroad and could be imitated or warded off by human wanderers".

It has also been suggested that the wearing of Halloween costumes developed from the custom of souling, which was practiced by Christians in parts of Western Europe from at least the 15th century. At Allhallowtide, groups of poor people would go house to house, collecting soul cakes—either as representatives of the dead or in return for praying for them. The Christian tradition of acknowledging the danse macabre is also suggested as the origin of dressing up on Halloween.

One 19th-century English writer said that Allhallowtide "used to consist of parties of children, dressed up in fantastic costume, who went round to the farmhouses and cottages, singing a song, and begging for cakes (spoken of as 'soul-cakes'), apples, money, or anything that the good wives would give them". The soulers typically asked for "mercy on all Christian souls for a soul cake". William Shakespeare mentioned the practice in his play The Two Gentlemen of Verona (1593). Christian minister Prince Sorie Conteh wrote on the wearing of costumes: "It was traditionally believed that the souls of the departed wandered the earth until All Saints' Day, and All Hallows' Eve provided one last chance for the dead to gain vengeance on their enemies before moving to the next world. To avoid being recognized by any soul that might be seeking such vengeance, people would don masks or costumes to disguise their identities".

In the Middle Ages, statues and relics of martyred saints were paraded through the streets at Allhallowtide. Some churches that could not afford these things had people dress as saints instead. Some believers continue the practice of dressing as saints, biblical figures, and reformers in Halloween celebrations today. Many Christians in continental Europe, especially in France, believed that on Halloween, "the dead of the churchyards rose for one wild, hideous carnival", known as the danse macabre, which has often been depicted in church decoration. An article published by Christianity Today claimed the danse macabre was enacted at village pageants and court masques, with people "dressing up as corpses from various strata of society" and suggested this was the origin of Halloween costume parties.

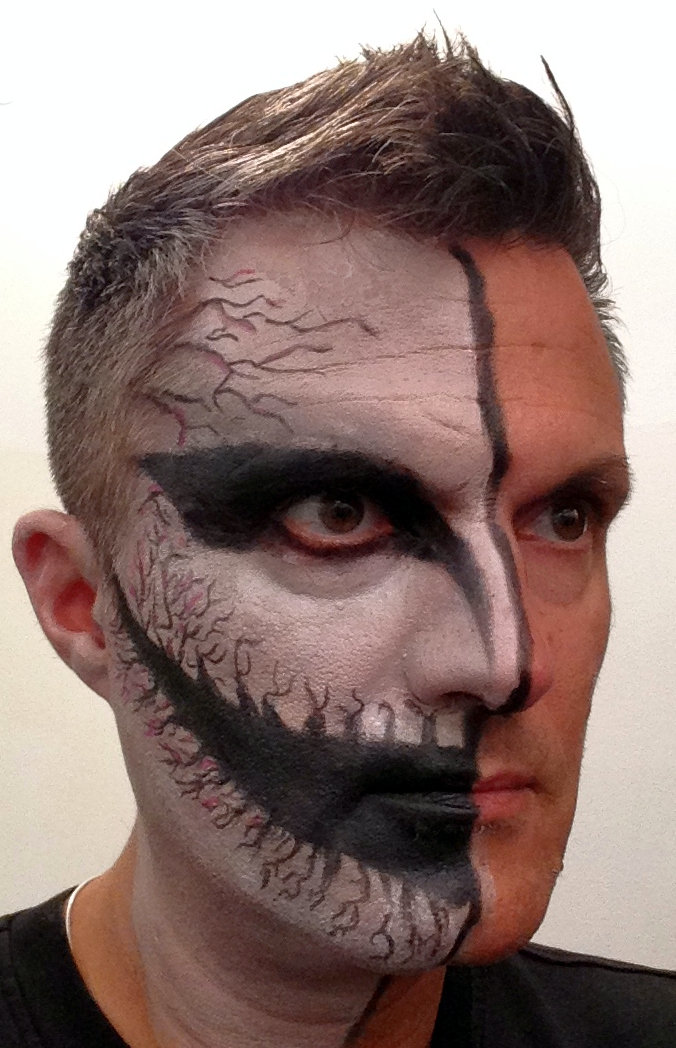
Facial makeup as masquerade is popular on Halloween, often referring to horror archetypes or various characters from movies or television shows.

The custom of guising at Halloween in North America was first recorded in 1911, when a newspaper in Kingston, Ontario reported children "guising" around the neighborhood. In 19th century America, Halloween was often celebrated with costume parades and "licentious revelries", but efforts were made to "domesticate" the festival to conform with Victorian-era morality. Halloween was made into a private rather than public holiday. Celebrations involving liquor and sensuality were de-emphasized, and only children were expected to celebrate the festival.

Early Halloween costumes emphasized the gothic nature of Halloween and were aimed primarily at children. Costumes were also made at home or using items (such as make-up) that could be purchased. In the 1930s, A. S. Fishbach, Ben Cooper, and other firms began mass-producing Halloween costumes for sale in stores as trick-or-treating became popular in North America. Halloween costumes are often designed to imitate supernatural and scary beings. Costumes are traditionally those of monsters such as vampires, werewolves, zombies, ghosts, and scarecrows. Pop culture began to influence costumes after World War II as costume production became more prevalent. By the late 20th century, television and film characters, sexually suggestive, and "campy" costumes rose in popularity with the participation of more adults.

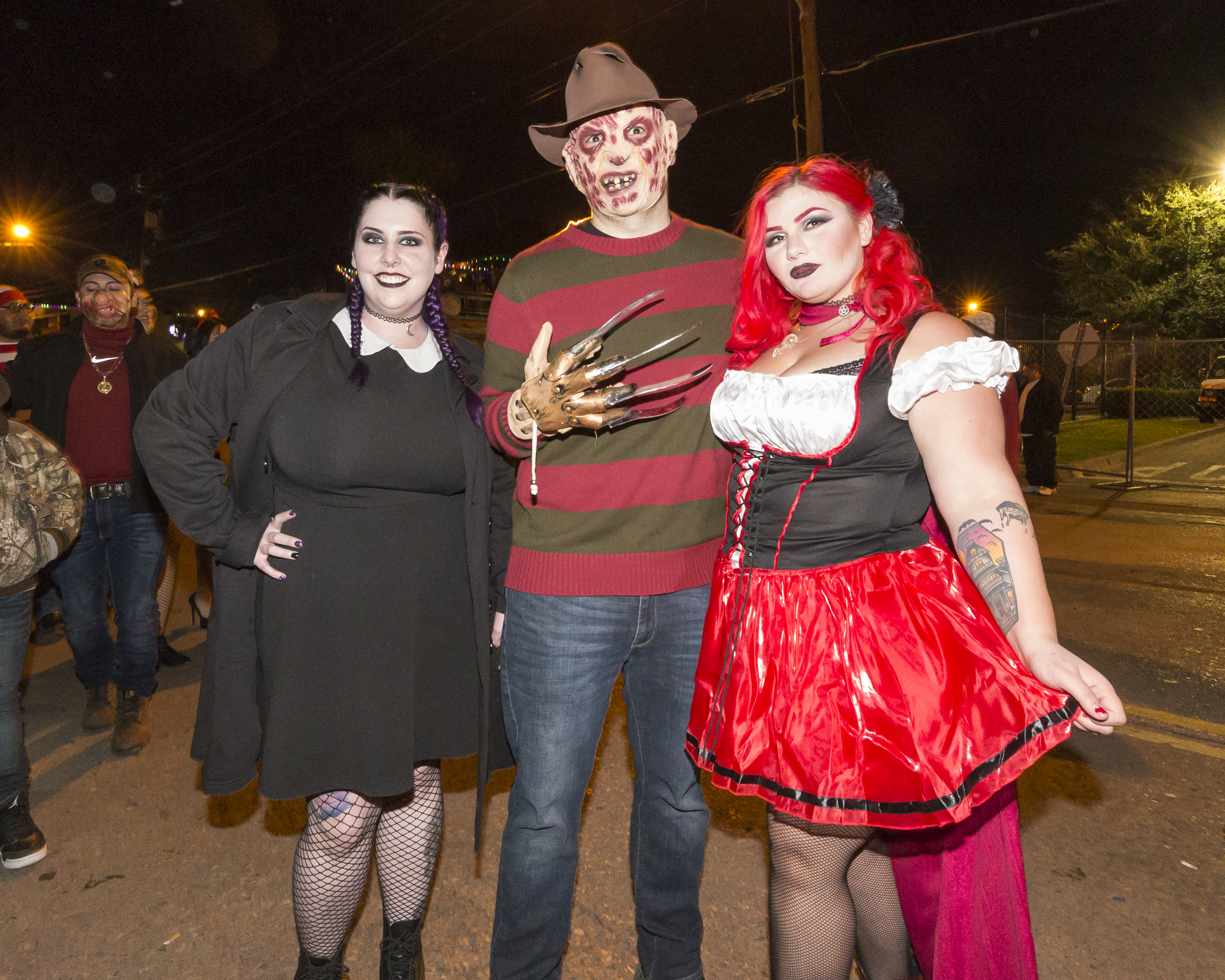
People in Halloween costumes

Halloween costume parties generally take place on or around October 31, often on the Friday or Saturday before the holiday. Halloween parties are the third most popular party type held in the United States, falling behind only to Super Bowl and New Year's Eve parties.

== Economics ==
In a National Retail Federation (NRF) study in the United States, it was found that 53.3% of consumers planned to buy a Halloween costume in 2005, spending $38.11 on average, up $10 from the year before. They were also expected to spend $4.96 billion in 2006, up significantly from just $3.3 billion the previous year, but the troubled economy caused many Americans to cut back on Halloween spending, and in 2009, the NRF anticipated that American households would decrease Halloween spending by as much as 15% to $56.31.

In 2013, Americans spent an estimated $6.9 billion to celebrate Halloween, including a predicted $2.6 billion on costumes (with more spent on adult costumes than for children's costumes) and $330 million on pet costumes. In 2017, it was estimated that Americans would spend $9.1 billion on Halloween merchandise, with $3.4 billion of that towards costumes. Another survey by the NRF showed that 67% of Halloween shoppers would buy costumes, spending $3.2 billion in 2019. It was estimated that the Halloween spending in 2022 would reach $10.6 billion.

=== Pet costumes ===
According to a 2018 report from the National Retail Federation, 30 million Americans spent an estimated $480 million on Halloween costumes for their pets in 2018. This is up from an estimated $200 million in 2010. The most popular pet costumes are the pumpkin, followed by the hot dog, and the bumblebee in third place. The figure rose to approximately $700 million in 2023. According to The Times in the UK, demand for animal costumes among British pet owners in the run up to Halloween in 2025 saw an almost 50% increase from 2024.

== Criticism ==
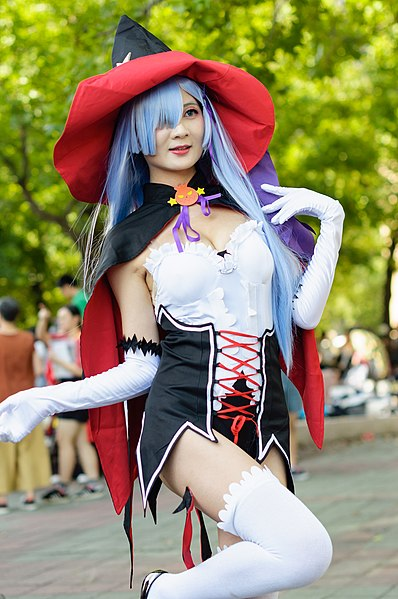
Woman dressed up for Halloween

Halloween costumes in the contemporary Western world sometimes depict people and things from present times and are sometimes read in terms of their political and cultural significance.

When costumes uncritically use stereotypical representations of other groups of people such as gypsies and Native Americans, they are sometimes denounced for cultural appropriation. For example, Immigration and Customs Enforcement (ICE) Secretary Julie Myers was involved in a scandal in 2008 at ICE's Halloween party when she made the Best Costume award to someone dressed as an "escaped Jamaican prisoner" with dreadlocks and blackface.

Halloween costumes can also generate controversy through overt sexualization of many women's costumes, despite a surprisingly long history of it.

== See also ==
- Ben Cooper, Inc.
- Halloween party
- Cosplay
- Fetish fashion
- Gothic fashion
- Punk fashion
- Rubber mask

== Bibliography ==
- Addis, M.E. Leicester. "Allhallowtide". Frank Leslie's Popular Monthly. 40:5 (November 1895)
- Dunwich, Gerina. A Witch's Halloween. Avon, Mass.: Adams Media, 2007.
- Denny, Dann. "Adults go for sexy or funny looks on Halloween". The Herald-Times (Bloomington, IN), 28 Oct. 2010: Newspaper Source Plus. Web. 9 Feb. 2013.
- Dowling, Melissa. "Sexy Sells Halloween Costumes". Multichannel Merchant 6.10 (2010): 56. Business Source Complete. Web. 9 Feb. 2013.
- "Halloween" in Encyclopedia of the End: Mysterious Death in Fact, Fancy, Folklore, and More. Deborah Noyes, ed. Boston: Houghton Mifflin Harcourt, 2008.
- Levinson, Stacey, Stacey Mack, Dan Reinhardt, and Helen Suarez, Grace Yeh (1992).
- "Halloween As a Consumption Experience", in NA - Advances in Consumer Research, 19. John F. Sherry Jr. and Brian Sternthal, eds. Provo, UT: Association for Consumer Research, Pages: 219–228.
- Lherm, Adrien. "Halloween — A 'Reinvented' Holiday" in Celebrating Ethnicity and Nation: American Festive Culture from the Revolution to the Early Twentieth Century. Geneviève Fabre, ed. New York: Berghahn Books, 2001.
- Nelson, Adie. "The Pink Dragon Is Female". Psychology of Women Quarterly 24.2 (2000): 137. Academic Search Complete. Web. 9 Feb. 2013.
- Northrup, Lesley A. Women and Religious Ritual. Washington, D.C.: Pastoral Press, 1993.
- Ogletree, Shirley Matile, and Larry Denton. "Age And Gender Differences In Children's Halloween Costumes". The Journal of Psychology 127.6 (1993): 633. Business Source Complete. Web. 9 Feb. 2013.
- Rogers, Nicholas. Halloween: From Pagan Ritual to Party Night. New York: Oxford University Press, 2002.
- Seltzer, Sarah. "Embracing Our Inner Monsters". The New York Times, 28 Oct. 2012: n. pag. Print.
