= Beggars Night =

Trick-or-treating before Halloween

Beggars Night, or Beggars' Night, is a regional term for the practice of going "Trick or Treat" in the period before Halloween night. Beggars Night emerged to address security concerns over young children involved in unsupervised Trick-or-Treating. Instead, younger children were encouraged to Trick-or-Treat on another night, before Halloween. The chosen date for Beggars Night varies and is typically dependent on the day Halloween falls each year. Beggars Night typically begins after school and often concludes between 6 and 8 pm.

The practice was fundamentally identical to that of Ragamuffin Day, a similar celebration in New York City from 1870 to the 1930s. Ragamuffin Day was traditionally associated with Thanksgiving before the interruptions of Thanksgiving dinner became seen as a nuisance, eventually moving into October.

== Regional celebrations ==
The practice occurs in parts of Ohio (central, the northeast and the northwest), Iowa, Nebraska, South Dakota, Kansas, Illinois, Indiana, Minnesota, Wisconsin, Western New York, Southern Maine, New Hampshire and Western Pennsylvania.

=== Buffalo, New York ===
In the Buffalo area, Beggars Night falls on October 30 and is a scaled up version of Halloween.

=== Des Moines, Iowa ===
In Des Moines Beggars Night falls on October 30 and children ring doorbells, say "Trick or Treat", then tell riddles or jokes such as, "What did the priest say when the church caught on fire?" "Holy smoke!" or, “What did the pumpkin do when it got hurt?” “It put on a pumpkin patch!” Children could historically recite a poem or sing a song instead of the joke. The tradition began in 1938, after early Halloween celebrations were rife with violence and vandalism; Beggars Night was adopted in hopes of deterring the chaos and providing a safer environment.

Des Moines and surrounding communities have continued to hold Beggars Nights on October 30 in lieu of traditional Halloween trick-or-treating; city law maintained that date for the next 86 years. In 2024, Beggars Night moved to coincide with Halloween for the first time since 1938, ostensibly due to severe weather; other communities had occasionally done the same in that span by local resolution, either to accommodate weather or to avoid holding it on a Sunday. Des Moines mayor Connie Boesen stated that, though the change would not be permanent, the city council would consider the results of the 2024 experiment and decide whether or not to make the move permanent.

In March 2025, Des Moines City Council voted to officially move Trick-or-Treating to October 31st permanently for Des Moines. Surrounding communities followed also moving their Trick-or-Treating nights to the 31st or the last Saturday of October. This effectively ends the 80+ year old Beggars Night tradition in the Des Moines area.

=== Columbus, Ohio ===
In Columbus, Ohio, a 1954 police report claimed that Halloween festivities had gotten too rowdy, and the city discontinued Trick-or-Treating. As a result, the cities surrounding Columbus started celebrating the day before or the Thursday before Halloween. The Mid-Ohio Regional Planning Commission (MORPC) sets Beggars Night dates for the region.

=== Washington, DC ===
In the 1950s Washington, D.C., and its immediate suburbs, Beggars Night fell on October 30. On Halloween night (October 31), schools held student costume parties. In the late 1940s, Greenbelt, Maryland the community celebrated Beggars Night and in 1947 there were reports of youths also participating in "Devil's Night" which on that occasion was held the night before Beggars Night.

=== New Hampshire ===
In Dover, New Hampshire, Portsmouth, New Hampshire, Rochester, New Hampshire and Seabrook, New Hampshire, Beggars Night is observed.

=== Houston, Texas ===
In 1993, residents of Candlelight Plaza, a small neighborhood north of the 610 Loop in Houston, Texas, decided to end Trick-or-Treat for kids who lived outside their neighborhood. They moved celebrations to October 30 and turned out lights on the 31st. The average age of the residents decreased over time, and more people began to go out on Halloween. However, the majority of residents (and adjacent neighborhoods of similar socioeconomic status) continue to celebrate Beggars Night. No person who enters is denied participation on the 30th, but some residents treat it as a private party whose details should only be shared with those personally known by the residents. Unlike other Beggars Night celebrations, this was not created or promoted by a municipality.

== In popular culture ==
On the week of October 27, 2014, some of General Hospital's characters celebrated Beggars Night.

== See also ==
- Mischief Night
