= Ragamuffin parade =

Annual event in the New York metropolitan area

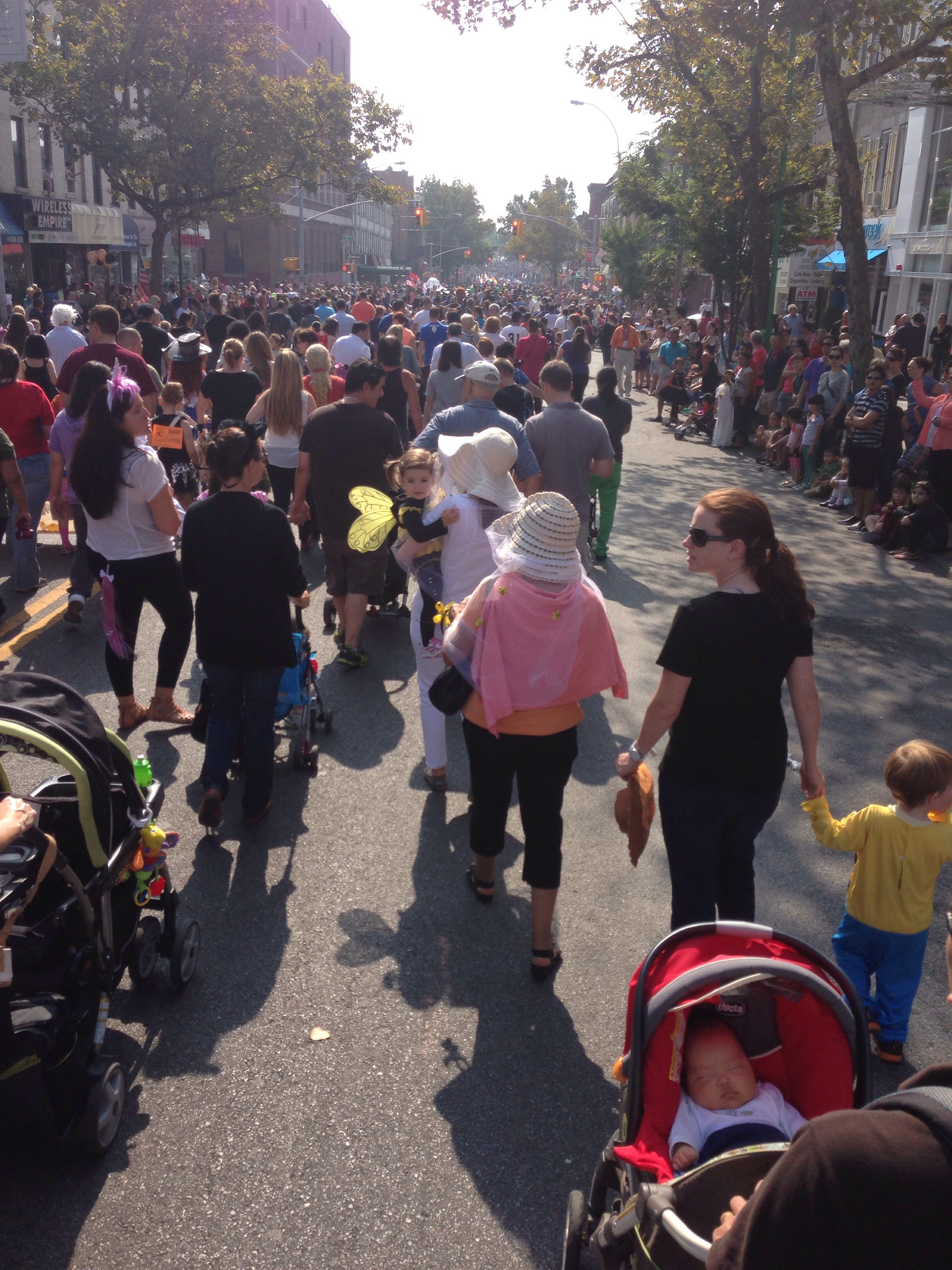
Part of Bay Ridge's 2013 Ragamuffin Parade

A Ragamuffin parade is an annual occurrence in communities in the New York metropolitan area. The parades feature children in their Halloween costumes, and typically are held in October or on Halloween. The holiday formed around 1870, a few years after US President Abraham Lincoln declared Thanksgiving a national holiday.

It had its origins with Ragamuffin Day (known in some jurisdictions as Beggars Day), a celebration as part of Thanksgiving, which involved children going door-to-door seeking candy, dressed as beggars and homeless residents of New York. Ragamuffin Day was a predecessor to Halloween, which rose in popularity in the 1940s and 1950s.

== History ==
=== Ragamuffin Day ===
Ragamuffin Day formed around 1870, a few years after US President Abraham Lincoln declared Thanksgiving a national holiday. Ragamuffin Day took place on Thanksgiving, and typically involved children going from door to door asking for candy or money, a tradition that started with mummers in Europe. These children were originally dressed in the style of the homeless of New York, with rags and oversized and exaggerated imitations of beggars. In further years, the children dressed as sailors, bandits and Disney characters. In the 1930s, the begging tradition was superseded by Ragamuffin parades, a predecessor of Thanksgiving Day parades. As Halloween became popular after the Great Depression, Ragamuffin events became less popular. However, children continued the traditions into the 1940s.

Around 1930, The New York Times published several articles in an attempt to end the tradition, that the children would "annoy adults" on Thanksgiving Day with their pleas for candy, money, and gifts. Later that year, the newspaper reported that the parades were scarce in New York City, except in its outskirts, where the subway lines end.

By 1937, several organizations began hosting Thanksgiving Day parades to discourage Ragamuffins, where the Thanksgiving parades would also feature children dressed both as beggars and in Halloween costumes. In the 1940s, some of these parades involved around 500 children. The last recorded Thanksgiving Day Ragamuffin parade was in 1956, overshadowed by Macy's Thanksgiving Day Parade. A Ragamuffin parade on October 15, 1972, in Bay Ridge, Brooklyn, brought about 6,000 children and a crowd of around 35,000, making it the largest Ragamuffin parade in the United States at that time.

=== Present day ===
Ragamuffin parades continued in the outer boroughs of New York City after losing popularity in Manhattan. The parades are still held in the area, including in Bay Ridge, held since 1966, Park Ridge, New Jersey, and in Hoboken, New Jersey. Other communities include the Westchester County municipalities Pleasantville, Larchmont, and Briarcliff Manor (where the parade has been held for about 30 years).

In September 2016, a street in Bay Ridge was renamed "Ragamuffin Way" in honor of the neighborhood's 50-year-old tradition.

Des Moines, Iowa, and surrounding communities continued to celebrate Beggars Night in lieu of traditional Halloween trick-or-treating, having set the night on October 30 every year from 1938 to 2023. City law maintained that date for 86 years, hoping to deter violence and vandalism associated with Halloween. In 2024, Beggars Night moved to coincide with Halloween for the first time since 1938, ostensibly due to severe thunderstorms; other communities had occasionally done the same in that span by local resolution, either to accommodate weather or to avoid holding it on a Sunday. Des Moines mayor Connie Boesen stated that, though the change would not be permanent, the city council would consider the results of the 2024 experiment and decide whether or not to make the move permanent. The change was made permanent in March 2025 by vote of the city council.

== See also ==
- Evacuation Day
