= Imperial Toy Corporation =

American toy company

Imperial Toy Corporation is a North Hills, California-based toy company founded in April 1969 by Fred Kort, best known for producing rubber animals. One of their best known products is an articulated Godzilla action figure that is available in several sizes and was regularly seen in the sitcom, Roseanne. They also made a licensed toy of the alien from Close Encounters of the Third Kind in 1978. Peter Tiger and Art Hirsch purchased the company from the Kort family in 2006, by which time the company had made over 900 products. It went bankrupt in 2020 and was acquired by another rack toy company, Ja-Ru, Inc.

== Original Products ==
- Halloween Spoooks: Boney Benny and Booo the Bat
- Apollo Moon Exploring Series
- The Hungry Mouse in the Cheese House (two rubber mice with rubber Swiss cheese wedge) (1970)
- Silly Dilly Sky Diving Poopatroopers (1971)
- Prehistoric Animals

== Licensed products ==
- Jaws (1975)
- The Phantom Jet (1975)
- Close Encounters of the Third Kind (1977)
- Hanna-Barbera's World Champion Skydivers (The Flintstones, Dyno-Mutt [sic], Scooby-Doo, Yogi Bear) (1978)
- Marvel Super Hero Finger Puppets (1978)
- 1941 Para Toys (1979)
- Manta and Moray Boy's Watch (1979)
- Buck Rogers Space Marbles (1980)
- Spider-Woman Jewelry Set and Vanity Set (1980)
- Tarzan Jungle Knife and Belt Set (1980
- Woody Woodpecker Submarine & Diver Set (1980)
- Mr. T Jewelry Set (1984)
- Godzilla (1985)
- King Kong (1986)
- The Delta Force "Chuck Norris as Scott McCoy" Paratrooper (1986)
- James Bond

== Controversy ==
In 2003, the United States Consumer Product Safety Commission sued them for importing toys that had twice been recalled for safety issues involving small parts.
