= Mischief Night =

Informal holiday

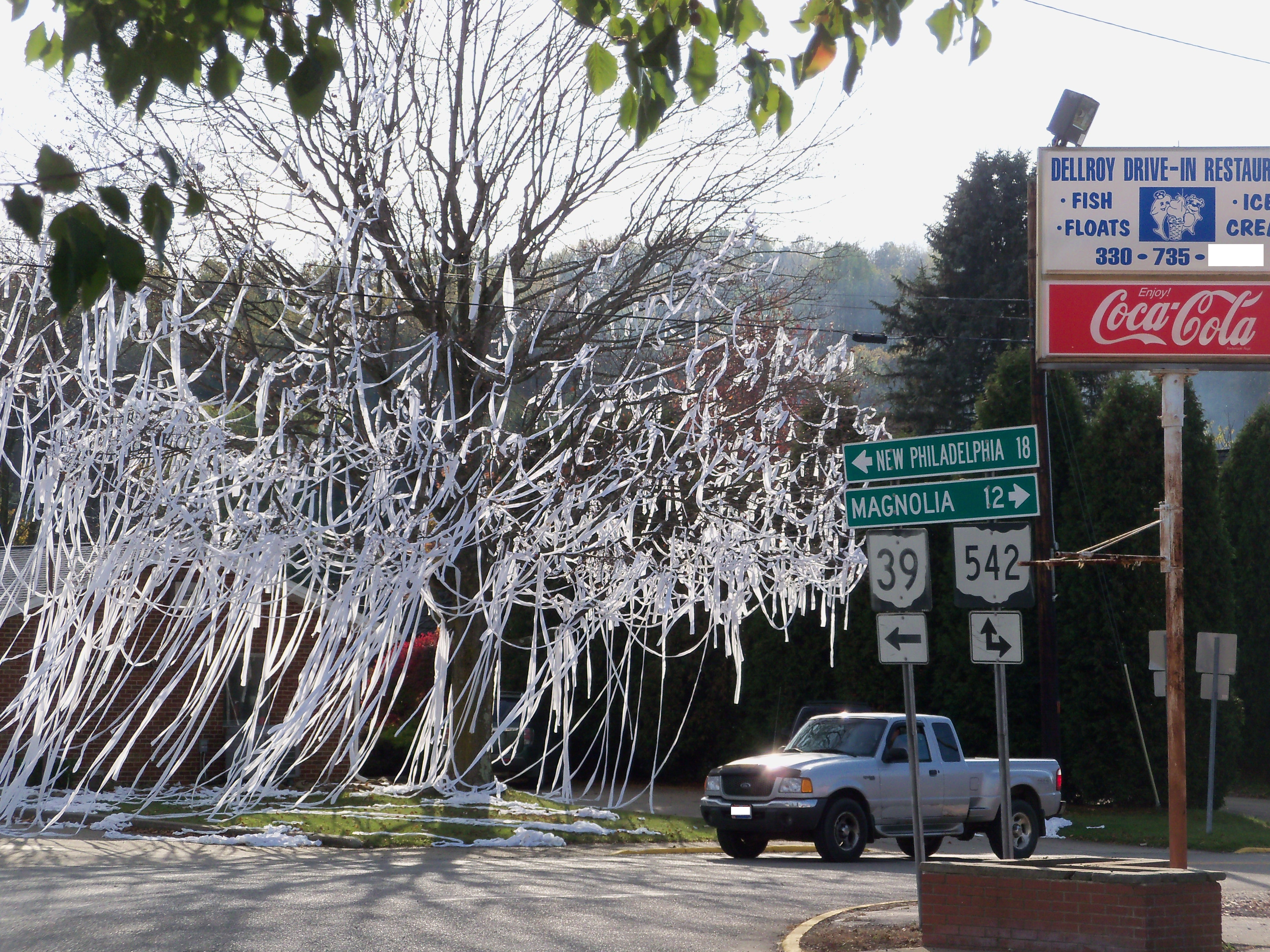
- Toilet papering is often practiced on Mischief Night
- Also called: Devil's Night; Gate Night; Goosey Night; Moving Night; Cabbage Night; Mat Night
- Observed by: Canada, Ireland, United Kingdom, United States
- Celebrations: Vandalism, practical jokes, pranks, parties
- Begins: 4th November Evening
- Date: 30 October (most commonly); 4 November (Northern England); 30 April (originally)
- Duration: 1 day (begins at sundown)
- Related to: Guy Fawkes Night Halloween

Mischief Night or Mischievous Night is an informal holiday where young people engage in jokes, pranks, vandalism, or parties on October 30th. It is celebrated mostly in Yorkshire and other parts of Northern England on the night before Guy Fawkes night, 4th November.

== Historical background ==
The earliest use of the phrase 'mischief night' comes from 1790, when a headmaster at St John's College, Oxford encouraged a school play which ended in "an Ode to Fun which praises children's tricks on Mischief Night in most approving terms". The concept of Mischief Night is certainly older though, as Puritan Philip Stubbs decries the May Day Eve mischief night as early as 1583.

In some regions in England, these pranks originated as part of 'Bringing in the May' on May Day Eve, but gradually shifted to later in the year. Dates vary in different areas, with some marking it traditionally on 4 November (the night before Bonfire Night), or the 30th October (the night before Halloween), though the latter is more common nowadays.

According to one historian, "May Day and the Green Man had little resonance for children in grimy cities. They looked at the opposite end of the year and found the ideal time, the night before the Gunpowder Plot." However, the shift only happened in the late 19th century and is described by the Opies as "one of the mysteries of the folklore calendar".

Word of Mischief Night began to appear in U.S. newspapers in the 1930s and 1940s and told of those who were celebrating wanting to put distance between the wholesome night of trick or treating and the chaotic night of causing havoc around the town. Some believed that the stress of the Great Depression was causing people to act out and this is what caused Mischief Night to break out at that time.

== Naming variations ==
=== Canada ===
West Kootenay (British Columbia), Vancouver Island, Thunder Bay (Ontario), and Winnipeg also called it "Gate Night"; in English-speaking Quebec it is known as "Mat Night" in reference to a tradition of stealing front door mats. "Devil's Night" is another common name in Canada.

In rural Niagara Falls, Ontario, during the 1950s and 1960s, "Cabbage Night" (French: Nuit de Chou) referred to the custom of raiding local gardens for leftover rotting cabbages and hurling them about to cause mischief in the neighbourhood.

=== United Kingdom ===
Some parts of the country hold a Mischief Night on 30 October, the night before Halloween. The separation of Halloween tricks from treats seems to have only developed in certain areas, often appearing in one region but not at all nearby regions. It is known in Welsh as Noson Ddrygioni and in Scottish Gaelic as Oidhche nan Cleas.

==== Northern England ====
In most areas of Northern England it is celebrated on 4 November, the night before Bonfire Night. In recent decades the tradition has moved to the night before Halloween.

In parts of Yorkshire as "Mischievous Night" or the shortened "'Chievous Night" "Miggy Night", "Tick-Tack Night", "Corn Night", "Trick Night" or "Micky Night" In some areas of Yorkshire, it is extremely popular among 13-year-olds, as they believe it to be a sort of coming-of-age ceremony.

In Liverpool and parts of the surrounding region, It is typically celebrated on 30 October, Mischief Night is often shortened to "Mizzy Night". Locally it has a reputation of causing anti-social and disruptive behaviour as well as vandalism in the area. In 2023 the night was described as being like a 'Warzone'. The local police force Merseyside Police often has increased patrols of areas on Mischief Night.

=== United States ===
In most of New Jersey, and other regions of the United States, including New Orleans, Philadelphia, the Lehigh Valley region of eastern Pennsylvania, Delaware, parts of New York state, and Connecticut, it is referred to as "Mischief Night".

In the Great Lakes region, Michigan, western New York, and western Pennsylvania it is known as Devil's Night.

In Des Moines, Iowa and its surrounding suburbs, it is known as “Beggar’s Night”. It is common for children to trick-or-treat on Beggar's Night rather than Halloween.

In some towns in North Jersey and parts of New York State, it is also known as "Goosey Night". Cabbage Night is also used in this area as it is the term used in Vermont, Connecticut, Bergen County (New Jersey), Upstate New York, Northern Kentucky, Newport (Rhode Island) and Western Massachusetts.

Baltimore (Maryland) traditionally refers the night as "Moving Night" due to the custom of exchanging or stealing porch furniture and other outside items.

It is known as "Gate Night" in Bay City (Michigan), Rockland County (New York), North Dakota and South Dakota.

In Detroit, which was particularly affected by Devil's Night arson and vandalism throughout the 1980s, many citizens took it upon themselves to patrol the streets to deter arson and other crimes. Started in 1997 as an initiative to combat the legacy of Devil's Night, "Angels' Night" usually ran October 29 through October 31 with up to 40,000 volunteers on patrol, around the time most Halloween festivities were taking place. However, official city support for Angels' Night patrolling was discontinued in 2018 after arson had declined significantly.

==== Detroit ====
Devil's Night, especially from the late 1960s to the 1990s, involved widespread serious vandalism and arson in the Detroit area. Devil's Night made its way to Detroit in the 1930s and 1940s. Traditionally, city youths engaged in a night of mischievous or petty criminal behavior, usually consisting of minor pranks or acts of mild vandalism (such as egging, soaping or waxing windows and doors, leaving rotten vegetables or flaming bags of canine feces on stoops, or toilet papering trees and shrubs) which caused little or no property damage. By the 1970s, the concept of Devil's Night as a phenomenon of a night of mischief and vandalism had spread, in a limited way, to cities around the state of Michigan, around the Midwest, and a few other cities around the country.

However, in Detroit in the early 1970s, the vandalism escalated to more destructive acts such as arson. This primarily took place in the inner city, but surrounding suburbs were often affected as well.

The crimes became more destructive in Detroit's inner-city neighborhoods, and included hundreds of acts of arson and vandalism every year. The destruction was worst in the mid- to late-1980s, with more than 800 fires set in 1984, and a number in the hundreds for each subsequent year until 2011. The damage was exacerbated by the severe population decline and widespread abandonment of buildings that occurred in Detroit during the 1970s and 1980s.

Devil's Night arson in Detroit had not declined by the early 1990s. After a brutal Devil's Night in 1994, mayor Dennis Archer promised city residents arson would not be tolerated. In 1995, Detroit city officials organized and established Angels' Night on and around October 29–31. Each year as many as 50,000 volunteers gather to patrol neighborhoods in the city. Many volunteers kept a high profile, patrolling neighborhoods with magnetic-mount flashing amber beacons on their personal vehicles, along with communicating with command centers via CB radios or by cellular phones to report any suspicious activity. Incidences of arson and other crimes declined, a success largely attributed to the Angels' Night volunteers. The drop in reported fires for the year 2008 was credited to the Angels' Night program. That same year, 35,000 signed up to volunteer in the city, according to Daniel Cherrin, spokesperson for Detroit Mayor Ken Cockrel Jr.

As a result of the efforts, the number of fires decreased to near-ordinary levels in the first decade of the 21st century. In 2010, the number of reported fires increased to 169, a 42 percent increase compared to the previous year. However, subsequent years saw the totals again decline to the low 90s for the three-day period. This average of about 32 fires per day is somewhat higher than the expected 26 fires per day through the year. 2015 saw 52 fires recorded and only 24 considered possibly arson. 2017 saw the lowest recorded number of fires with only 21 fires recorded. That year, on November 1, Mayor Mike Duggan announced that the city would end the Angels' Night patrols, based on recommendations from Fire Chief Eric Jones and Police Chief James Craig.

== Modern practice in the United States ==
Mischief Night is generally recognized as a New Jersey, New York, Eastern Pennsylvania, Connecticut, Maryland and Delaware, phenomenon.

Mischief Night tends to include popular tricks such as toilet papering yards and buildings, powder-bombing and egging cars, people, and homes, using soap to write on windows, "forking" yards (the practice of inserting a series of forks across a lawn), setting off fireworks and smashing pumpkins and jack-o'-lanterns. Local grocery stores often refuse to sell eggs to children and teenagers around the time of Halloween for this reason. Occasionally the damage can escalate to include the spray-painting of buildings and homes. Less destructive is the prank known as "Ding-dong ditch".

In New Orleans, from 2014 to 2018, Mischief Night involved a series of unruly parade-like riots. According to participants, the Mischief Night 'krewes' follow in New Orleans' carnival's centuries-old tradition of 'walking parades', most of which take place in the lead-up to Mardi Gras. Mixing revelry with mindless violence, Mischief Night parades involve thematic floats and costumes as well as targeted vandalism and fires. Targets of vandalism, attacks and arson have included the police, bystanders and property.

When asked in an interview from 2017 how Mischief Night in New Orleans fits into the context of carnival, a parader replied "Our Carnival traditions are those that actually want to 'turn the world upside down'." After a parade through downtown in 2016 that saw bonfires in the street, police cars hit with paint and the Battle of Liberty Place Monument chipped away at with a sledgehammer, another participant wrote:

There is no longer a middle ground; that's been seized for luxury condos. The choice is stark: we either collectively build a more combative spiritual practice or we collude in ceding our ritual spaces of encounter to the oppressors.

In some areas of Queens, New York, Cabbage Night historically included throwing rotten fruit at neighbors, cars, and municipal buses. A prominent regional urban legend from the 1980s alleges that local youths filled hollowed-out eggs with chemical depilatories, such as Neet or Nair, to throw at unsuspecting targets; however, mainstream contemporary media and police archives lack documented verification of these specific chemical attacks. More verifiable escalation during the mid-to-late 1980s involved destructive acts of arson, with local youths setting fire to garbage piles and brush within the borough's large historic cemeteries.

By the end of the 2010s, the destructive elements of Devil's Night in Detroit had largely ceased to exist. In 2018, formal support of Angels' Night was ended with city resources being instead allocated to host neighborhood Halloween parties. Devil's Night 2018 recorded a total of five structure fires, with only four on the night before. Devil's Night 2021 saw the lowest totals in multiple decades, with only three structure fires recorded. In the 2010s, the decline of Devil's Night fires coincided with an increase in similar arson on the nights surrounding the July 4 Independence Day holiday.

== In popular culture ==
=== Film and television ===
- Are You Afraid of the Dark?, season 1 episode 4 "The Tale of the Twisted Claw" opens on Mischief Night and plays an important role in the plot of the episode.
- In the 1994 film The Crow, the protagonist and his fiancée are murdered on the eve of their Halloween wedding on "Devil's Night" by a street gang on the orders of Detroit's most notorious crime lord, Top Dollar. With the help of a mystical crow, Eric returns from the grave on "Devil's Night" one year later to exact revenge against the crime lord and his henchmen.
- In the 1997 film Grosse Pointe Blank, Debbie (Minnie Driver) refers to the reason why she is living with her father is because her apartment was burned on Devil's Night.
- A 1999 episode of Rocket Power explores the joys of Mischief Night in The Night Before.
- A 2006 film, Mischief Night, is based on events surrounding this night in Leeds, U.K.
- NCIS Season 7 Episode 5 "Code of Conduct", the dead body of a prankster is found on Mischief Night.
- Lark Rise to Candleford: In episode 11 of the third series, Dorcas Lane and the citizens of Candleford and Lark Rise celebrate Mischief Night.
- "Devil's Night" is the title of the sixth episode in the sixth season of Criminal Minds. In the episode, the FBI's Behavioral Analysis Unit (BAU) is called to Detroit to help catch a serial killer who burns people alive once per year in the days leading up to Devil's Night.
- A horror film was released in 2013, Mischief Night, directed by Richard Schenkman.
- A different horror film was released in 2014, also called Mischief Night and directed by Travis Baker.
- "Devil's Night" is the title of the fourth episode of American Horror Story: Hotel, which is the fifth season of the series. It allowed the ghosts of former serial killers like Aileen Wuornos, Jeffrey Dahmer, John Wayne Gacy, and Richard Ramirez to return to the Hotel Cortez for a mischievous night.
- Orange Is the New Black: In season 6, episode 5, the main characters are subjected to pranks throughout the episode because of "Mischief Night".
- An episode of the documentary miniseries Flint Town called "Devil's Night" focuses on arson in Flint.
- "Devil's Night" is the title for the second episode of the third season of Scream, as the events in the episode take place the night before Halloween.

=== Music ===
- In 1993, underground Detroit rapper Esham released his song "Devil's Night", about arson and mayhem in the city.
- "Devil Nights", a song by Detroit-based rock band Electric Six from their 2005 album Señor Smoke, uses the holiday as an extended metaphor for a debauched night on the town.
- In 2024, the Insane Clown Posse held their Devil's Night Creature Double Feature at the Majestic Theatre in Detroit, Michigan which featured a Juggalo Championship Wrestling show and a concert featuring the ICP themselves as the Bitchin' Wild Bucks. The concert and wrestling show aired live as a pay-per-view on Triller TV.
- Detroit hip-hop group D12's 2001 debut album is titled Devil's Night which also features a song with the same title.
- Beginning in 2003, an annual series of horrorcore mixtapes called "Devilz Nite" was released.
- "Devil's Night" is the title of a song from gothic metalcore band Motionless in White's album Infamous.

=== Literature ===
- "Devil's Night" is the title of author Penelope Douglas' book series centered on the holiday itself.

=== Sports ===
- On October 30, 2023, the Detroit Lions recorded their first “Devil’s Night” home victory at Ford Field in Detroit, against the Las Vegas Raiders.

== See also ==
- List of practical joke topics
- Nain Rouge
- Beggars Night
