= Louis Morneau =

- Occupations: Film director; screenwriter
- Years active: 1991–2012

Louis Morneau is an American film director, producer and screenwriter.

== Life ==
Morneau has been described as a "graduate of the Roger Corman school".

He is the director of various B/cult films, including what Dread Central calls ’the notoriously terrible’ Bats, in 1999, a film, however, praised by Mark F. Berry in his book about dinosaur films, in which this author considers that Bats is a ’handsome and misunderstood fifties-monster homage’’, explaining Morneau's personal style by his former career as film editor. The B movie French site Nanarland sees in him a "yes man", who "is not inherently bad, but (who) will quickly specialize in broke direct-to-video (Bats, Hitcher II).". Morneau is also known for being "the man behind horror sequels Joy Ride 2: Dead Ahead, The Hitcher: I've Been Waiting, Carnosaur 2".

After Carnosaur 2 in 1995, he directed Retroactive, and Made Men the year after, both starring Jim Belushi, the latter also starring Timothy Dalton.

== Personal life ==
Morneau was the long-time partner of the actress Catherine Cyran.

== Filmography ==
Year	Title	Functioned as			Notes
Year	Title	Director	Writer	Producer	Notes
1991	To Die Standing	Yes	No	No	aka Crackdown; Starring Cliff DeYoung and Robert Beltran
1992	Final Judgement	Yes	No	No	Starring Brad Dourif, Karen Black and Isaac Hayes
1992	Quake	Yes	No	Yes	Starring Steve Railsback and Erika Anderson
1995	Soldier Boyz	Yes	No	No	Starring Michael Dudikoff and Cary-Hiroyuki Tagawa
1995	Carnosaur 2	Yes	No	No	Starring John Savage and Cliff DeYoung; Sequel to Carnosaur
1995	Hellfire	No	Story	No	Directed by David Tausik; Starring Ben Cross and Beverly Garland
1997	Retroactive	Yes	No	No	Starring Jim Belushi and Kylie Travis
1998	Made Men	Yes	No	No	Produced by Richard Donner and Joel Silver; Starring Jim Belushi, Timothy Dalton and Steve Railsback
1999	Bats	Yes	No	No	Starring Lou Diamond Phillips and Dina Meyer
2003	The Hitcher II: I've Been Waiting	Yes	No	No	Starring C. Thomas Howell, Kari Wuhrer and Jake Busey; Sequel to The Hitcher
2004	Bet Your Life	Yes	Yes	No	Starring Billy Zane
2004	Slipstream	No	Yes	No	Starring Sean Astin, Vinnie Jones and Ivana Miličević
2008	Joy Ride 2: Dead Ahead	Yes	No	No	Starring Nicki Aycox, Nick Zano and Kyle Schmid; Sequel to Joy Ride
2012	Werewolf: The Beast Among Us	Yes	Yes	No	Starring Ed Quinn, Stephen Rea and Steven Bauer; Unofficial sequel to The Wolfman
