= Gabriel Pelletier =

Canadian film and television director (born 1958)

Gabriel Pelletier (born 1958 in Montreal, Quebec) is a Canadian film and television director. He is best known for his 1996 film Karmina, for which he was a Genie Award nominee for Best Screenplay and Best Director at the 18th Genie Awards in 1997.

His other credits have included the films L'Automne sauvage, Life After Love (La Vie après l'amour), My Aunt Aline, Karmina 2 and Fear of Water (La Peur de l'eau). He directed the 1991 Canadian suspense thriller TV film, Shadows of the Past, starring Nicholas Campbell and Erika Anderson. It tells the story of photo journalist Jackie Delaney (Erika Anderson) who wakes up in the hospital with amnesia after a mysterious car accident. Haunted by flashbacks of the accident, she checks out of the hospital determined to unravel the mystery behind her recent past.

Pelletier also directed episodes of the television series War of the Worlds, Sirens, Emily of New Moon and The Secret Adventures of Jules Verne. He has also directed music videos for Luc de Larochellière, Richard Séguin, Pierre Flynn, Marie-Denise Pelletier, René Simard and Daniel Lavoie.

In 2014, he signed to direct a film adaptation of Robert Girardi's 1997 novel Vaporetto 13.
