= Janne Mortil =

Canadian-American actress

- Born: Canada
- Occupation: Actress
- Years active: 1973–2003; 2018

Janne Mortil is a Vancouver-based Canadian actress probably best known for playing Madeleine Astor in Titanic (1996) and Michelle Dupont in the television series Side Effects, for which she was nominated for a Gemini, and Detective Tricia Kelsey in Street Justice (1991–1993).

== Career ==
Janne Mortil began her career with a 1973 appearance in The Beachcombers at the age of five. She was a regular in the 1970s soap opera House of Pride. She performed on stage in the 1979 Vancouver Playhouse Theatre Company's production of The Innocents and appeared in 1980 in Huckleberry Finn and His Friends television series.

Her movie roles include Sally Moffat in Little Women (1994). In 1996, she played Madeleine Astor in the television movie Titanic, opposite Catherine Zeta-Jones. In 2003, she played Sergeant Kibble in Hitcher 2.

Her television credits include 21 Jump Street, The X-Files, Poltergeist: The Legacy and Cold Squad. In 1992 she provided narration for the CBC documentary mini-series The Valour and the Horror. She played also Detective Tricia Kelsey on Street Justice (1991–1992) and Michelle Dupont, the clinic's receptionist in Side Effects (1994–1996). For the latter role, she was nominated for a 1996 Gemini Award for Best Performance by an Actress in a Supporting Role in a Dramatic Series.

== Personal life ==
Mortil lived in Montreal with Tony Nardi, her former partner, since 1995.

== Filmography ==
=== Film ===
Year	Title	Role	Notes
1980	The Changeling	Linda Grey	
1986	The Clan of the Cave Bear	Ovra	
1987	Malone	Helen	
1991	Chaindance	Loni	
1994	Whale Music	Star	
1994	Tokyo Cowboy	Shelly	
1994	Little Women	Sally Moffat	
2002	The Santa Clause 2	Pamela's Mother	
2003	The Hitcher II: I've Been Waiting	Sergeant Kibble	Video

=== Television ===
Year	Title	Role	Notes
1973	The Beachcombers		Episode: "Bush Fever"
1974	House of Pride		
1980	Huckleberry Finn and His Friends	Susie Harper	Episodes: "Such a Lovely Funeral", "Huck Is a Hero", "The Millionaires"
1983	The Beachcombers		Episode: "Wave of the future"
1986	That Secret Sunday	Lisa	TV film
1987	Danger Bay	Brenda	Episode: "Big Horns"
1987	21 Jump Street	Karla / Sheila	Episodes: "Don't Pet the Teacher", "You Oughta Be in Prison"
1988	Nightmare at Bittercreek	Tracy Senia	TV film
1989	Neon Rider	Deidre Ogilvry	Episode: "Dude"
1990	21 Jump Street	Cara / Diane	Episodes: "Last Chance High", "This Ain't No Summer Camp"
1990	Neon Rider	Tracy	Episode: "The Mighty Quin"
1991	Neon Rider	Charlene	Episode: "1117"
1991	My Secret Identity	Linda Blane	Episode: "Slave for a Day"
1991-1992	Street Justice	Det. Tricia Kelsey	Recurring role (11 episodes)
1992	Death by Moonlight: Bomber Command	Mary "Bubbles" Moore	TV film
1992	The Valour and the Horror	Mary Moore 'Bubbles'	TV documentary miniseries
1992	A Killer Among Friends	Kathy Pearl	TV film
1993	Liar, Liar: Between Father and Daughter	Chrissy Berezuk	TV film
1993	North of 60	Leslie Baxter	Episodes: "Freeze Out", "All About Leslie", "Southern Comfort"
1994-1996	Side Effects	Michelle Dupont	Main role (29 episodes)
1995	Johnny's Girl	Angie	TV film
1995	Mixed Blessings	Nancy	TV film
1996	The X-Files	Mona Wustner	Episode: "Teso Dos Bichos"
1996	Poltergeist: The Legacy	Sarah	Episode: "Town Without Pity"
1996	Titanic	Madeleine Astor	TV miniseries
1996	Two	Patty	Episode: "Reunion"
1996	Viper	Evie	Episode: "Street Pirates"
1996	Rossini's Ghost	Young Martina	TV film
1997	Contagious	Judith	TV film
1998	Cold Squad	Rikki Stanfield	Episode: "Michelle Dorn"
2000	Cold Squad	Colleen Walsh	Episode: "Trust"
2000	Da Vinci's Inquest	Melanie Stone	Episode: "The Hottest Places in Hell"
2017	Suits	Judge	Episode: "Divide and Conquer"
2018	The Romanoffs	Gloria	Episode: "Expectation"

== Awards and nominations ==
Year	Award	Category	Title of work	Result
1996	Gemini Award	Best Performance by an Actress in a Supporting Role in a Dramatic Series	Side Effects (for episode #1.10: "The Great Chendini")	Nominated
