= The Pirate's Daughter =

1997 mystery novel by Robert Girardi

- First edition (US)
- Author: Robert Girardi
- Language: English
- Genre: Mystery novel
- Publisher: Delacorte Press (US); Hodder & Stoughton (UK)
- Publication date: 1997
- Publication place: United States
- Media type: Print (Hardcover)
- Pages: 324 pp
- ISBN: 0-385-31485-X
- OCLC: 34546224
- Dewey Decimal: 813/.54 20
- LC Class: PS3557.I694 P57 1997

The Pirate's Daughter: A Novel of Adventure is a 1997 mystery novel by Robert Girardi, published by Delacorte Press. It follows the plot structure of Homer's Odyssey, in a modern setting, featuring pirates in the slave trade who use modern financial instrumentation.

== Plot ==
The novel follow Wilson Lander who is drawn aboard a pirate ship by a women named Cricket. Throughout the journey, he experience a series of adventures at sea.

== Reception ==
Paula Friedman of the New York Times felt that Girardi's "rendering of [the pirate island] is lush and commanding, despite the horror it reveals."
