= Extreme (1995 TV series) =

- Created by: Didier LaFond; Ron Booth; Robert Wolterstorff; Mike Scott
- Starring: James Brolin; Julie Bowen; Cameron Bancroft; Danny Masterson; Jeffrey Dean Morgan; Brooke Langton; Tom Wright; Elizabeth Gracen; Dey Young; Justin Lazard; Shannon Sturges; Patricia Charbonneau
- Theme music composer: Phil Ramone
- Country of origin: United States
- Original language: English
- No. of seasons: 1
- No. of episodes: 13 (6 unaired)

Production
- Executive producer: Alan Barnette
- Producers: Ron Booth; Didier LaFond
- Production companies: Greengrass Productions; Alan Barnette Productions; Universal Television

Original release
- Network: ABC
- Release: January 29 – April 6, 1995

Extreme is an American television adventure drama that premiered on ABC on January 29, 1995, following Super Bowl XXIX. Starring James Brolin, Extreme was centered on a search and rescue team which operated in the Rocky Mountains.

Although thirteen episodes were ordered and the network had enough faith in the series to give it the coveted post-Super Bowl timeslot, Extreme could not find an audience and ABC cancelled the series after seven episodes aired. The final episode aired on April 6, 1995, and the remaining six episodes were never aired in the United States.

The failure of Extreme forced a reconsideration of post-Super Bowl programming strategy by the major networks. NBC chose to commission a special episode of Friends to air immediately following Super Bowl XXX the next year and the experiment was such a success that other networks subsequently often chose to air one of their established series after the Super Bowl, with particular attention paid to season premieres of popular reality competitions like Survivor and The Voice. The practice of premiering a new series following the Super Bowl has not been fully discontinued; Fox debuted Family Guy in 1999, American Dad! in 2005, and 24: Legacy in 2016 while CBS launched Undercover Boss in 2010, its reboot of The Equalizer in 2021, and Tracker in 2024.

== Plot ==
A search and rescue team operates a Bell 204B "Super Huey" helicopter in the Rocky Mountains of Utah. The show features the trials and tribulations of the rescue team and the daring rescues undertaken in "Steep Mountain."

The series was filmed on location in Park City, Utah.

== Characters ==
- Reese Wheeler (James Brolin), a former downhill racer, is the seasoned leader of the Steep Mountain Rescue Unit. Wheeler is both manager of and father-figure to the group.
- Farley Potts (Tom Wright), a soft-spoken Vietnam vet and helicopter pilot.
- Andie McDermott (Julie Bowen) part of the rescue team and love interest of Kyle Hansen.
- Sarah Bowen (Brooke Langton)
- Kyle Hansen (Cameron Bancroft), newest member of the team is grappling with the tragic death of his fiancée.
- Sheriff Lynn Roberts (Patricia Charbonneau), town sheriff who gets engaged to Reese Wheeler, but is tragically shot and killed by a poacher during a traffic stop.
- Callie Manners (Elizabeth Gracen), a real estate agent and old girlfriend of Kyle who is obsessed with winning him back.
- Lance Monroe (Justin Lazard), a suave self-promoter who will stop at nothing to get what he wants
- Skeeter (Danny Masterson)
- Bones Bowen (Micah Dyer), younger brother of Sarah. He and Skeeter often get into mischief.
- Marnie Shepard (Dey Young), divorcee mother of Andie McDermott and owner/operator of the local Red Rider Cafe. Her ex-husband's fossilized remains are found in the last episode, raising questions of his activities after leaving Marnie and Andie.

== Episodes ==
| No. | Title | Directed by | Written by | Original release date |
|---|---|---|---|---|
| 1 | "Pilot" | Anthony Hickox | Story by : Didier LaFond & Ron Booth & Robert Wolterstorff & Mike Scott; Teleplay by : Robert Wolterstorff & Mike Scott | January 29, 1995 |
| 2 | "The Harder They Fall" | Anthony Hickox | Story by : Robert DeLaurentis & Tom Chehak; Teleplay by : Tom Chehak | March 2, 1995 |
| 3 | "Breaking Away" | Michael Keusch | Story by : Robert DeLaurentis & Tom Chehak; Teleplay by : Tom Chehak | March 9, 1995 |
| 4 | "Higher Ground" | John Kretchmer | Story by : Robert DeLaurentis & Tom Chehak; Teleplay by : Sherri Ziff | March 16, 1995 |
| 5 | "Competitive Edge" | Michael Keusch | Story by : Tom Chehak & Sherri Ziff; Teleplay by : Sherri Ziff | March 23, 1995 |
| 6 | "Death Do Us Part" | Paris Barclay | Story by : Tom Chehak & Nan Hagan; Teleplay by : Nan Hagan | March 30, 1995 |
| 7 | "Into the Deep" | John McPherson | Story by : Tom Chehak & Nan Hagan; Teleplay by : Nan Hagan | April 6, 1995 |
| 8 | TBA | N/A | N/A | Unaired |
| 9 | TBA | N/A | N/A | Unaired |
| 10 | TBA | N/A | N/A | Unaired |
| 11 | TBA | N/A | N/A | Unaired |
| 12 | TBA | N/A | N/A | Unaired |
| 13 | TBA | N/A | N/A | Unaired |

== See also ==
- List of Super Bowl lead-out programs
