= Gorgeous East =

2009 novel by Robert Girardi

- First edition
- Author: Robert Girardi
- Language: English
- Genre: Adventure
- Publisher: St. Martin's Press
- Publication date: 2009
- Publication place: United States
- Media type: Print (hardcover)
- Pages: 352 pp
- ISBN: 978-0-312-56586-2
- OCLC: 016756
- Dewey Decimal: 813/.54 22
- LC Class: PS3557.I694 C76 2009

Gorgeous East is an adventure novel by Robert Girardi.

== Plot introduction ==
John Smith, an out of work actor, after toxic relationships in Istanbul, and Paris, joins the French Foreign Legion.

== Publishing history ==
Originally published by an American publisher, St. Martin's Press, in 2009.

== Criticism ==
Library Journal:

Equal parts update of Beau Geste and gonzo parody, Girardi's latest novel is ... the tale of three French Foreign Legionnaires: de Noyer, an aristocratic, Satie-worshipping French officer suffering from insomnia and genetic insanity; Pinard, a French-Canadian noncom with an oboe and an ugly past; and John Smith (his real name, not the alias chosen by many comrades), a failed American musical comedian just becoming aware of his life's vapidity... Fans of political commentary or violent dark humor will find much to enjoy....

Kirkus:

...Characterizations are brisk and vivid, as the story whips along toward a violent climax with a nice surprise twist.... Girardi pits the French Foreign Legion against Muslim fanatics. Since Louis Philippe founded the Legion in 1831, its lost-soul volunteers fight in the most desolate corners of the globe mostly because they have nothing better to do with their lives. American musical comedy actor John Smith winds up in the Legion after a disastrous trip to Istanbul that results in the murder of the girlfriend who jilted him for a wealthy Turk. Sous-lieutenant Evariste Pinard, a French Canadian drug dealer and enforcer for a Russian loan shark in France, chose the Legion over prison and deportation.
