= Zandalee =

- Home video release poster
- Directed by: Sam Pillsbury
- Written by: Mari Kornhauser
- Produced by: William Warren Blaylock; Eyal Rimmon
- Starring: Nicolas Cage; Judge Reinhold; Erika Anderson; Viveca Lindfors; Aaron Neville; Joe Pantoliano
- Cinematography: Walt Lloyd
- Edited by: Michael Horton
- Music by: Pray for Rain
- Production company: Electric Pictures
- Distributed by: Live Home Video; ITC Entertainment (overseas distribution)
- Release date: July 18, 1991
- Running time: 104 minutes
- Country: United States
- Language: English

Zandalee is a 1991 American erotic thriller/romantic tragedy directed by Sam Pillsbury, and starring Nicolas Cage, Judge Reinhold, Erika Anderson, Viveca Lindfors, Aaron Neville, Joe Pantoliano and Steve Buscemi. The screenplay by Mari Kornhauser is based on Émile Zola's 1867 novel and 1873 play Thérèse Raquin.

Although receiving a theatrical release in some countries, Zandalee was released straight to video in the United States, to negative reviews.

== Plot ==
Zandalee Martin is a young boutique store owner living in New Orleans who is sexually frustrated and feeling unfulfilled with her marriage to Thierry Martin, and eventually becomes tangled in a passionate, sensual and torrid adulterous affair with her husband's mysterious and free-spirited old friend Johnny Collins. Zandalee and Thierry's marriage has hit a snag and seems to be eroding due to his lack of passion.

Zan needs to explore, while Thierry wants to withdraw, and has become more and more distant and impotent in their relationship. He used to be a poet, but now has taken over the family's communications business after the death of his father. As time goes on, Thierry has to sell the business and is essentially a figurehead. He is emotionally adrift as his dreams give way to disillusionment.

Johnny, a painter by trade, has been working for Thierry's business to help support his paintings. His only religion is self-gratification. Johnny also sells and mules cocaine for a local drug dealer as another source of income for himself. Having not seen each other in a while, the two run into each other at a bachelor party. After the party, Thierry brings Johnny home to meet Zandalee and his grandmother Tatta. While talking about old times, Johnny offers to paint a portrait of Thierry at their home.

Later, after finishing the painting, Johnny shows it to Thierry, Zandalee and Tatta. Sensing Zandalee's frustration and vulnerability, Johnny makes a pass at her. Johnny continues to pursue Zandalee and when they run into each other during a rainstorm, he takes advantage and seduces her. Their sexual liaisons continue to occur in various places, including her laundry room atop a washing machine while Thierry and guests are having dinner. Thierry soon suspects the two are having an affair.

As the affair intensifies, Johnny meets Zandalee in a church and asks her to leave her husband. However, Zandalee feels that she must never abandon Thierry, and quickly ends her affair with Johnny after he forces himself on her in the confessional. She and Thierry re-commit themselves to each other, but Johnny, now obsessed with her, will not be brushed off that easily. He tracks them to their vacation spot in the Bayou.

When Thierry figures out that Johnny has been having an affair with Zandalee, he becomes drunk and confrontational, leading to his becoming reckless when he takes Zandalee and Johnny for a speedboat ride on the Bayou. Thierry falls off the boat and drowns, refusing to be saved by either Zan or Johnny who dive into the water to save him. Both Zandalee and Johnny become distraught by Thierry's death and begin to isolate themselves with Zandalee jogging for long periods and Johnny working on his paintings, but becoming more self-destructive. Johnny rips up some of his paintings and pours black paint all over himself. He also consumes some of the cocaine he is supposed to sell, which gets him in trouble with his supplier.

When Johnny meets with Zandalee in order to restart their romance and have a possible future together now that Thierry is out of the picture, she remains emotionally distant and instead goes for a walk along the Old Quarter with Johnny following her. When Johnny's drug supplier attempts to kill him in a drive-by shooting outside the church that Zandalee frequents, she shields Johnny and is killed. The drug dealer flees from the scene of the crime, leaving behind Johnny, now alone, as he cradles and holds Zandalee's dead body. He then walks in front of the church with the lifeless Zandalee in his arms.

== Cast ==
- Nicolas Cage as Johnny Collins
- Judge Reinhold as Thierry Martin
- Erika Anderson as Zandalee Martin
- Viveca Lindfors as Tatta
- Aaron Neville as Jack
- Joe Pantoliano as Gerri
- Marisa Tomei as Remy
- Steve Buscemi as OPP Man
- Ian Abercrombie as Louis Medina
- Zach Galligan as Rog

== Production ==
Erika Anderson said that in the scene where Nicolas Cage paints her naked body, the actor "put in such brutality and such participatory violence, that I was terrified, I felt really violated. We had to stop shooting and do it all again the next day. The rushes were pure pornography, they traumatized me."

== Release ==
Zandalee was released in the United States on July 18, 1991 as a video premiere. Other countries releasing the film were Germany, on May 9, 1991, the United Kingdom on May 10, 1991, Hong Kong on May 16, 1991, the Netherlands on November 15, 1991 and Australia on February 13, 1992.

=== Rating ===
Originally rated NC-17 by the Motion Picture Association of America, Zandalee had its rating surrendered before release. There is both the original "unrated and uncut" version and an "R rated" version. The international version has a few more scenes which help explain the characters a bit better than the U.S. versions. Some versions have enhanced color as well.

One German version of the movie was titled Love Affair, but it is the same movie. According to the May 1991 issue of Premiere magazine, the movie was originally called Adios, then Adios Thierry, and finally it was settled on Zandalee.

=== Critical reception ===
The film received generally negative reviews. It holds a 33% rating on Rotten Tomatoes based on 6 reviews, with an average rating of 3.96/10. Nathan Rabin called it a perfect vehicle for Cage and analyzed it as a lost gem for his My Year of Flops column in The A.V. Club: "I'm going to argue that it's a Secret Success, especially for Cage buffs. It's right up there with Wicker Man on the Nicolas Cage guilty pleasureometer, a lost camp gem filled with inadvertent hilarity and populated by heavyweight actors who would go on to do great things, including Steve Buscemi as a zany, horny, oddly philosophical thief who pops up at random intervals."
