= Justin Lazard =

American film director

- Born: November 30, 1967 (age 58); New York
- Occupations: Actor, producer, writer, model
- Years active: 1988‒2003

Justin Lazard (born November 30, 1967) is an American retired actor, producer, writer and model.

== Early life ==
Lazard was born in New York, but raised in Connecticut. His father, Sidney Lazard, is a former foreign correspondent, and his mother, Julie (née Thayer), is a photographer. In 1974, the family relocated to Paris where his father was stationed by ABC News. After his parents' divorce when he was a freshman in high school, Lazard marked time in boarding schools and at Emory University. Transferring to NYU to study acting, he was "discovered" in a bar by a talent agent and was soon appearing in TV commercials.

== Acting career ==
After a small role in Spike of Bensonhurst in 1988, Lazard landed the recurring role of a punk-rock undercover cop on NBC's Miami Vice, appearing in three episodes. To pay for acting classes, he began a brief career as a model. Small parts in features (i.e., Born to Ride in 1991) and regular roles in unsuccessful series (e.g., Second Chances; CBS 1993–94) followed.

In 1995, Lazard landed the role of a charming stockbroker on the primetime CBS soap Central Park West, but the series floundered and despite some retooling and a title change to "CPW", the show was cancelled after its second season. He starred in Extreme (1995) as part of a Rocky Mountain rescue team but the series was cut short after 7 episodes. He had a role in the direct-to-video release The Big Fall (1997).

Working in partnership with his brother Marc through Lazard Productions, he began to create material for himself. His most notable role was in Species II (1998) as an astronaut who mutates into an alien bent on having sex with human women and impregnating them, creating a race of alien children. He went on to produce the thriller Dark Harbor (1998), which he co-scripted with director Adam Coleman Howard. Lazard also served as executive producer on Stanley's Gig in 2000, written and directed by his brother, Marc. This would be his last acting role before retiring from the industry.

His most recent film activity was as co-producer of The Americans Are Coming, the Americans Are Coming! in 2003.

== Arrest for indecent exposure ==
On the evening of July 4, 2006, in Lakeport, California, Lazard was arrested and charged with indecent exposure and resisting arrest, having been caught "exposing himself near one of the piers" of Library Park. Lakeport police officers confronted Lazard while he was exposing his genitals and masturbating near a children's playground in the park, where a juvenile and several others witnessed the incident. During the arrest, Lazard was tasered by one of the officers. In May 2009, he failed to appear in court and a bench warrant was subsequently issued for his arrest.

In January 2011, Lazard reached a plea agreement with Lake County prosecutors regarding the charges of 2006. He pleaded guilty to a misdemeanor charge of "lewd conduct", with the other charges being dismissed, and agreed to pay $7,500 to a named family resource center. His psychiatrist attested that his behavior was due to a transitory “severe psychotic breakdown” and that "treatment had worked well" in his case.

== Filmography ==
Film
Year	Film	Role	Notes
1988	Spike of Bensonhurst	Justin	AKA Throw Back!
1991	A Smile in the Dark	—	AKA A Day in L.A. AKA California 405; AKA Destination Unknown; AKA Jungle of Love
1991	Born to Ride	Brooks	
1992	Final Embrace	Pierce	
1994	Marilyn, My Love	Brian	
1994	Dead Center	Joe	AKA Crazy Joe
1996	Dead Girl	Young Actor	
1996	The Big Fall	Bill Dickson	
1997	Love Walked In	Lenny	AKA Ni el tiro del final (Argentinian Spanish)
1998	Species II	Patrick Ross	
1999	Universal Soldier: The Return	Captain Blackburn	AKA Universal Soldier IV
2000	The Giving Tree	T.J.	AKA Brutal Truth; AKA Shaded Places; AKA The Brutal Truth
2000	Stanley's Gig	Joshua	
Television
Year	Title	Role	Notes
1988–89	Miami Vice	Joey Chandler/Keith	3 episodes
1992	In the Heat of the Night	Brian Moseley	1 episode
1992	Freshman Dorm	Joe Ellis	4 episodes
1993–94	Second Chances	Kevin Cook	5 episodes
1995	Extreme	Lance Monroe	7 episodes
1995–96	Central Park West	Gil Chase	21 episodes
1998	Welcome to Paradox	Leo Lawson	1 episode
1999	Partners	Brendan	1 episode
