= Welcome to Paradox =

Science fiction television series

- Countries of origin: United States; Canada
- No. of seasons: 1
- No. of episodes: 13

Production
- Running time: 60 minutes
- Production companies: River Of Stone Productions; Chesler Perlmutter Productions; Alliance Communications Corporation

Original release
- Network: Sci-Fi Channel (U.S.); Showcase (Canada)
- Release: August 17 – November 9, 1998

Welcome to Paradox was a Canadian science fiction television series aired on the Sci Fi Channel in the U.S. and subsequently on Showcase in Canada. It was first broadcast on August 17, 1998, ran for one season, with the final episode being released November 9, 1998. As this was part of a crop of new shows produced in 1998 by Sci Fi Channel and it was not successful beyond the first season, it was never placed in syndication. Betaville was the original title for the series.

The series is an anthology hybrid. The stories all took place in the fictional future city of "Betaville", a nod to Jean-Luc Godard's Alphaville. However, the majority of the stories were adapted from short stories that were originally unconnected with that fictional city. The stories were adapted from older works by famous science fiction authors which explored the impact of certain technologies on the human body and psyche, and the theme of humanity being overwhelmed by hostile technologies. Each episode had a host—originally to be named "Paradox" until the concept was dropped—that served as a narrator, adding a prologue and epilogue to the show as with The Twilight Zone and The Outer Limits. The Volkswagen New Beetle was chosen to be the transportation of Betaville; one was used whenever a car was needed in a story.

Guest stars in the series include Steven Bauer, Roma Maffia, Ice-T, A Martinez, Nicholle Tom, Rodney Rowland, Justine Priestley, Mayim Bialik, Lochlyn Munro, Channon Roe, Henry Rollins, Alice Krige, Justin Lazard, William McNamara, and Dana Ashbrook.

== Setting ==
Betaville, a fictional utopian city existing at an unspecified future point in time, is the setting for stories in Welcome to Paradox. Societal problems such as crime, violence, and disease have been resolved, but there is a dark undercurrent in Betaville that impacts some citizens directly. Episode plots highlight issues such as technology has invaded daily life to the point that simulated reality is preferred to actual reality, perfect machines wresting control from wealthy and pampered owners, and humanity being challenged by genetic and social engineering programs that push the limits of arrogance and sanity.

== Episodes ==
No.	Title	Directed by	Written by	Original release date
1	"Our Lady of the Machine"	Clark Johnson	Alan Dean Foster & Miguel Tejda-Flores	August 17, 1998
A fully 3D hologram of the Holy Madonna is being used by someone to extort money from the citizens of Betaville. Luckily Detective Angel Cardenas is on the case. His intuition comes in handy in what looks like an easy case, but in reality he will soon discover that the hologram is not a hologram at all and the Holy Madonna may be real. Cast: Steven Bauer as Detective Angel Cardenas; Conan Graham as Guard; Suzy Joachim as Virgin Mary holograph; Brandy Ledford as Sergeant Darcy
2	"Research Alpha"	Charles Wilkinson	James H. Schmitz, A. E. van Vogt & Jeremy Lipp	August 24, 1998
At a secure facility for genetic research the scientists are getting bored with the simple and unexciting new genetic therapies they have come up with. That is when one of the scientists decides to test his human evolution acceleration therapy on himself. This of course is going to be fraught with undesirable consequences. Cast: Roma Maffia as Barbara Cloak; Robert Wisden as John Hammond; Brent Stait as Vincent Cloak; Chilton Crane as Helen Hammond
3	"The Winner"	Charles Wilkinson	Donald E. Westlake & George Melrod	August 31, 1998
The maximum security prison of the future has arrived. The prison needs no bars as pain-inducing implants can control the prisoner's will, thus locking them inside their minds any time they attempt to leave the electronic perimeter. Like all prisons, though, there is always one inmate that has a plan to escape. Cast: Leanne Adachi as Waitress; Colin Banner as Inmate; Jennifer Clement as Inspector Sarah Klein; Deryl Hayes as Doctor; Terry Howson as Big Man; Ice-T as Revell; Shaun Johnston; Blu Mankuma as Franklin; Stephen E. Miller as Warden; Ian Tracey as Cole
4	"News from D Street"	Guy Magar	Andrew Weiner & Miguel Tejda-Flores	September 7, 1998
Another detective story set in Betaville, however this time the P.I. must find a missing person. It soon becomes apparent to him that he and the citizen he is looking for are living in an alternate reality. A simulated reality of advanced cybernetic design Cast: A Martinez as Rasheed Kay; Claudette Mink; Ron Sauvé
5	"The Girl Who Was Plugged In"	Jorge Montesi	James Tiptree Jr. & Jeremy Lipp	September 14, 1998
A suicidal girl has come to realize that her existence is worthless because of her lack of beauty. She is given a second chance when her brain is used as an advanced remote control for an artificially grown beautiful young bio organic robot who will become a media sensation. The only question is can she now handle all the freedom she has never known? Cast: Brennan Elliott; Harmoni Everett as Crease; Samantha Ferris as Woman Executive; Adam Harrington as Davey; Megan Leitch as P. Burke; Hrothgar Mathews as Joe; Gerard Plunkett as Carbondale; Tobias Raineri as Soap Star; Peter Stebbings as Paul; John Tench as Director; Ingrid Tesch as Psychomed Nurse; Nicholle Tom as Delphi B.
6	"The Extra"	Rod Pridy	Greg Egan & William Harrison	September 21, 1998
A wealthy old man has himself cloned so that he can transplant his brain into younger versions of himself. This would insure him perpetual youth and perhaps eternal life. His life gets an unexpected turn when the target clone begins to realize who he is and what he was created for. Cast: Dean Barrett as Reporter #1; Stacee Copeland as Guest; Garry Davey as Dr. Caver; Mark Holden as Clerk; Alison Matthews as Agent; Eileen Pedde as Reporter #2; Justine Priestley as Sarah Dale; Tanya Reid as Reporter #3; Rodney Rowland as Daniel Grey/ C7; Peter Williams as Dr. Ben Polaris; Gerald Wong as Bodyguard
7	"Alien Jane"	Jorge Montesi	Kelley Eskridge & Rick Drew	September 28, 1998
A girl that has the uncanny ability to feel no pain tries to hold on to her sanity when she becomes a human test subject. As the tests intensify she finds herself trying to hold on to her humanity. Cast: Mayim Bialik as Rita; Peter Graham-Gaudreau as Jane's Father; Gabrielle Miller as Jane
8	"Hemeac"	Paul Ziller	E.G. Von Wald & Micheal Thoma	October 5, 1998
Hemeac is a student at a school run entirely by machines. Computer controlled androids teach the students mind expanding educational material as well as mechanical precision and computer logic. Unfortunately the Dean of Students is breaking down thus forcing Hemeac to react beyond his learning, but is the time to act too late? Cast: Zachary Ansley as Obsic; Gillian Carfra as Machine Shop Instructor; Kendall Cross as Class Instructor; Anaya Farrell as Dean; Robert Gauvin as Soldier; Woody Jeffreys as Dorm Monitor Droid; Rebecca Nygard; Channon Roe as Hemeac
9	"All Our Sins Forgotten"	Bruce McDonald	David Ira Cleary & Miguel Tejada-Flores	October 12, 1998
A therapist develops a device that can erase the bad memories of his patients. But at what cost? Cast: Claudette Carracedo as Rwanda; Bernie Coulson as Frank Daskin; Brendan Fletcher as Rudy; Alice Poon as Claire Brazil; Henry Rollins as Dr. Ovid Brazil; Sarah Strange as Dr. Newman; Michael Sunczyk as William Steele
10	"Acute Triangle"	Jorge Montesi	Rob Chilson & Micheal Thoma	October 19, 1998
A wealthy scientist falls in love with a biologically enhanced robot (Biorobe). His marriage failing, his wife struggles with the fateful decision to leave him. The Biorobe however desires to be much more than a compliant companion and in the end she could be just what the husband and wife need. Cast: Mackenzie Gray as Ardley Mendoza; Alice Krige as Aura Mendoza; Monika Schnarre as Bio-Rob: Dorothy Duncan; Ken Tremblett as Mr. Wen; Peter Wilds as Jean Paul
11	"Options"	John Greyson	John Varley & Scott Frost	October 26, 1998
Technology has enabled the populace of Betaville to change ones sex as easily as changing ones clothes. So when Cleo Lawson finds that her husband is a philanderer she takes the opportunity to change her sex as a means to understanding what it is to be a man, and perhaps why her husband is the way he is. Cast: D. Harlan Cutshall as Bartender; Edward Diaz as Receptionist; Justin Lazard as Leo Lawson; Chris Logan as Dr. Marion Charles; Cyndi Mason as Janice; Robert Moloney as Jules Lawson; Veena Sood as Faith; Nancy Sorel as Cleo Lawson; Jill Teed as Nora
12	"Blue Champagne"	John Greyson	John Varley & Jeremy Lipp	November 2, 1998
Q.M. a worker in a futuristic healing resort called "Blue Champagne" becomes smitten with virtual reality superstar Megan Galloway when she arrives for some convalesence. The relationship takes a passionate turn but soon fails after he realizes that his emotions are sold to the VR producers as part of her performance contract. Cast: Jennifer Copping as Q.M.'s Girlfriend; Rachel Hayward as Megan Galloway; William McNamara as Q.M.; Mikela J. Mikael as Girl; Klodyne Rodney as Coco; Alex Zahara as Malcolm
13	"Into the Shop"	Jorge Montesi	Ron Goulart & Andrew McEvoy	November 9, 1998
The future of law enforcement has arrived in Betaville. Called "Lawagons" the black artificially intelligent vehicles patrol the streets with their human partners dispensing justice throughout the city. Federal Police Marshal Stu Clemens' Lawagon however has developed a glitch in its systems and now at the behest of his human partner has become judge, jury and executioner. A prop of a green squeezable alien head stress toy that was played with by the episode's lead is a promotional item given at trade shows by the Sci Fi Channel, complete with the channel's name written on it. Cast: Dana Ashbrook as Federal Police Marshal Stu Clemens; Leigh Cronish as Attendant; Ray Galletti as Earl; Jennie Rebecca Hogan as Marshal Shield; Rhonda Legge as A10 (voice); Brad Loree as Otterson; Sean Day Michael as Gridface; Jorge Montesi as Captain Kepling; Michael Nemirsky as Sheldon Kruger; Rebecca Reichert as Diane Marmon

== Home media ==
Though an Australian PAL (Region 4) boxed set of the entire series exists, the series was never released in any format in North America or Europe. The series can be viewed in those areas through some web sites and streaming services. In Canada it is currently streaming on the Roku channel 471-sci-fi.
