= Quake (1992 film) =

Quake (Aftershock)
- Directed by: Louis Morneau
- Written by: Rob Kerchner and Mark E.Schwartz
- Produced by: Roger Corman
- Starring: Erika Anderson; Steve Railsback
- Cinematography: Mark Parry
- Edited by: Robert Goodman
- Music by: Nigel Holton
- Distributed by: Columbia TriStar
- Release date: June 23, 1992
- Running time: 85 minutes
- Country: United States
- Language: English

Quake, also known as Aftershock (USA) and The Stalker, is a United States suspense thriller direct-to-video film directed by Louis Morneau and released on June 23, 1992. The film stars Steve Railsback and Erika Anderson.

== Synopsis ==
During the 1989 Loma Prieta earthquake, a young couple, Jenny and David, is terrorized by their neighbor Kyle. Jenny is knocked unconscious during the earthquake. She is then kidnapped by Kyle in her collapsing apartment building as David attempts to navigate the ruins of San Francisco to rescue her.

== Cast ==
- Steve Railsback as Kyle
- Erika Anderson as Jenny
- Eb Lottimer as David
- Burton Gilliam as Willie
- Marlon Archey as Joe
- Peter Looney as Boatman
- Dick Miller as Storekeeper
- Rick Dean as Young Tough
- Mike Pniewski as Cop On Crowd
- P.J. Pesce as Man In Crowd

== Release ==
The film was released directly to video in the UK by 20:20 Vision under the title The Stalker
