= The Hitcher II: I've Been Waiting =

- Release poster
- Directed by: Louis Morneau
- Written by: Molly Meeker; Charles R. Meeker; Leslie Scharf
- Based on: Characters by Eric Red
- Produced by: Charles R. Meeker; Alfred Haber; Kevin M. Kallberg; Oliver G. Hess
- Starring: C. Thomas Howell; Kari Wuhrer; Jake Busey
- Cinematography: George Mooradian
- Edited by: Glenn Garland
- Music by: Joe Kraemer
- Production companies: Alfred Haber Productions; Charles R. Meeker Productions
- Distributed by: Universal Studios Home Video
- Release date: July 15, 2003
- Running time: 89 minutes
- Country: United States
- Language: English

The Hitcher II: I've Been Waiting is a 2003 American direct-to-DVD road horror thriller directed by Louis Morneau and starring C. Thomas Howell, returning as Jim Halsey, Kari Wuhrer as his girlfriend Maggie, and Jake Busey as psychotic hitchhiker Jack. It is the sequel to the 1986 film The Hitcher. The film was released on direct-to-DVD in the United States on July 15, 2003.

== Plot ==
Fifteen years after the events of The Hitcher, Jim Halsey (C. Thomas Howell) now works as a police officer. He has recently been suspended for using excessive force on a kidnapping suspect, and decides to visit retired Captain Esteridge in Texas to talk about his lingering mental issues. Jim's girlfriend, Maggie (Kari Wuhrer), who has a crop dusting business, is unaware of Jim's past and pleads to come along.

Arriving in Texas, the couple pick up a car that Estridge has left for them, and set off to his house. The drive on the lonely road triggers Jim's PTSD, and when they see an RV that has been run off the road, blood dripping through the door, Jim refuses to stop and help. A motorcycle speeds past them and crashes. Maggie insists they take the driver on board. The hitchhiker named Jack (Jake Busey) is insistent on making small talk and joking with them, but Jim is overwhelmed and evicts him from the car.

Jim and Maggie are eventually pulled over by a cop, but have been also followed by Jack, who has hijacked an 18-wheeler truck and killed its driver. Jack shoots the cop and tries to grab Jim and Maggie but is thrown off the car when they escape.

The couple arrive at the Esteridge residence late at night, but the Captain and his wife have been killed by Jack. Jim and Maggie are caught in a shootout between Jack, who is in the hayloft of the barn, and the local police, who have arrived on the scene. Jim pushes Maggie out of harm's way and is shot by Jack. As he dies, he tells her to kill him. Maggie escapes in her car.

Maggie falls asleep in the desert. When she wakes up, she is knocked unconscious and put inside an abandoned water tower on the verge of collapsing. Jack taunts her and then leaves. Maggie escapes and uses his 18-wheeler to get away. She arrives at a gas station, makes a phone call and cleans up. Jack has followed her and kills the clerk. He intends to frame Maggie for all the killings, and as part of this plan, cuts off his own finger. The police arrive at the gas station. Jack spins his story and Maggie is arrested. She is transported by the sheriff's van, but during the journey the vehicle is knocked on its side by an excavator. Jack kills all the police officers of the escort, and tosses the key and a revolver to Maggie to make it look like she killed them.

Maggie rams a mail carrier plane from a nearby airfield into Jack's stolen tanker truck, but escapes the ensuing explosion. She finds the unconscious Jack and ties him to the truck. When he wakes up, realizing he is trapped, he begs for mercy. Before Maggie can execute him, the police show up. Jack yells that Maggie is trying to kill him. The police free Jack and shoot Maggie in the leg as she attempts to enter the truck's cab. Once free, Jack kills the cops. Maggie gets a safe distance away and shoots the tanker, which explodes and kills Jack. Maggie drops the shotgun to the ground and stands in the road, facing the remains of the burning truck.

== Cast ==
- C. Thomas Howell as Jim Halsey
- Kari Wuhrer as Maggie
- Jake Busey as Jack
- Janne Mortil as Sergeant Kibble
- Mackenzie Gray as Lieutenant
- Shaun Johnston as Sheriff Castillo
- Steve Railsback as Deputy Jessup (uncredited)

== Reception ==
David Nusair of Reel Film gave the film one and a half stars, citing weak production values and the contrivance of the killer being a second hitch-hiking maniac with no connection to the one from the first film. However, he praised C. Thomas Howell's performance, while noting that the film places much more focus on Kari Wuhrer.
