= The Wrong Doyle =

2002 novel by Robert Girardi

- First edition
- Author: Robert Girardi
- Cover artist: Rodrogo Corral
- Language: English
- Genre: Mystery novel
- Publisher: Sceptre
- Publication date: 2002
- Publication place: United Kingdom
- Media type: Print (Hardcover)
- Pages: 337 pp
- ISBN: 1-932112-18-9
- OCLC: 53992957
- Dewey Decimal: 813/.54 22
- LC Class: PS3557.I694 W76 2004

The Wrong Doyle is a mystery crime novel by Robert Girardi, first published in the UK in 2002. It was published in the US in 2004.

== Plot summary ==
Tim Doyle returns to the Eastern Shore of Virginia after the death of his Uncle Buck. He meets the keeper of Uncle Buck's inheritance, Maggie Peach.
