= Madeleine's Ghost =

Book by Robert Girardi

Madeline's Ghost
- First edition
- Author: Robert Girardi
- Language: English
- Genre: Mystery novel
- Publisher: Delacorte Press
- Publication date: 1995
- Publication place: United States
- Media type: Print (Hardcover)
- Pages: 356 pp
- ISBN: 0-385-31482-5
- OCLC: 31606778
- Dewey Decimal: 813/.54 20
- LC Class: PS3557.I694 M3 1995

Madeleine's Ghost is a first mystery novel by Robert Girardi.

== Publishing history ==
An editor for Delacorte Press found the manuscript for Madeleine's Ghost on a friend's coffee table and fell in love with the story.
