= Final Judgment (1992 film) =

1992 American drama film

Final Judgement
- Directed by: Louis Morneau
- Screenplay by: Kirk Honeycutt
- Release date: 1992
- Running time: 90 min.
- Country: United States
- Language: English

Final Judgment is a 1992 American drama film directed by Louis Morneau.

== Plot ==
Father Daniel Tyrone was, in his past, a gang member. He is accused of the murder of a stripper. To prove his innocence, he has to go back to his old life and also explore the underworld of the pornographic industry.

== Cast ==
- Brad Dourif as Daniel Tyrone
- Karen Black
- Isaac Hayes

== Reception ==
A review in the TV guide stated, "This hybrid maniac crimestopper and the hoodlum-priest saga is intravenously fed by an infusion of lurid sex scenes." A review for the German website Action Freunde found that "There's also not much going when it comes to action, which is a shame because it is one of Morneau's strengths. But a few tame car chases hardly get the pulse going. At the same time, the murder scenes are neither particularly hard nor generate much emotion in the viewer, as the potential victims are far too indifferent. At the end, there is a somewhat useful showdown in the burning artist's studio before we quickly move on to the end credits."
