= Bats (film) =

1999 American horror film

- Theatrical release poster
- Directed by: Louis Morneau
- Written by: John Logan
- Produced by: Bradley Jenkel; Louise Rosner
- Starring: Lou Diamond Phillips; Dina Meyer; Carlos Jacott; Bob Gunton
- Cinematography: George Mooradian
- Edited by: Glenn Garland
- Music by: Graeme Revell
- Production company: Destination Films
- Distributed by: Destination Films (United States); Columbia TriStar Film Distributors International (international)
- Release date: October 22, 1999
- Running time: 91 minutes
- Country: United States
- Language: English
- Budget: $5.2 million
- Box office: $10.2 million

Bats is a 1999 American horror film directed by Louis Morneau, written by John Logan and produced by Bradley Jenkel and Louise Rosner. The film stars Lou Diamond Phillips, Dina Meyer, Bob Gunton and Leon. It was the first film released by Destination Films. A hostile swarm of genetically mutated bats terrorizes a local Texas town, and it is up to zoologist Sheila Casper, who teams up with town Sheriff Emmett Kimsey, to exterminate the creatures before they take more lives.

The film grossed $10 million against a $5.2 million budget, and was panned by critics.

== Plot ==
After people start to die in the fictional small Texas town of Gallup, the prime suspects are bats. The Centers for Disease Control and Prevention (CDC) calls in chiropterologists Dr. Sheila Casper and her assistant, Jimmy Sands, to investigate the situation. Dr. Alexander McCabe is secretive about the situation, but admits that the bats were genetically modified by him to become more intelligent and also omnivorous so they would not be in danger of extinction any longer. Sheila is disgusted by this, but it seems that McCabe had the best intentions.

Aided by Sheriff Emmett Kimsey and CDC specialist Dr. Tobe Hodge, Sheila and Jimmy begin to search for the bat roost. The first night they are attacked and manage to capture one and plant a tracking device on it. However, as soon as they let it go, it is killed by the other bats, who understand the strategy. Emmett decides that Gallup needs to be evacuated, and the mayor is told to broadcast a warning to all residents to stay indoors and secure their houses. Unfortunately, no one listens. The bats invade the town and, within minutes, chaos ensues and several people are killed, including Dr. Hodge, who sacrifices himself to save Sheila.

The National Guard arrives and begins evacuating the town. They give Sheila and her bat hunters 48 hours before they destroy the town in hopes of killing the bats. Sheila sets up headquarters in the school. The military has promised to center the infrared cameras of a Chromo-B340 satellite on the area around Gallup to help locate the bat roost. Even when the roost is located, however, Sheila is at a loss how they can exterminate all the bats, of which there must be several thousand: bombing the roost will only scatter them, leading to the creation of other roosts and spreading the infestation through the rest of the country; while the most popular bat poison is only marginally effective against bats, but highly lethal to humans. Sheila thinks the best solution is to lower the temperature inside the roost, since doing so will cause the bats to hibernate instead of flying away, before they freeze to death.

Jimmy arranges for an NGIC Industrial Coolant that uses freon, carbon dioxide, and oxygen to be dropped off as soon as the roost is located, in a cave that Emmett recognizes as an abandoned mine. Everything is set to begin at 0600 hours—except that the government has other ideas, which do not include waiting until dawn. During the night, they wire the mine with explosives set to trap the bats inside and freeze them. Unfortunately, the bats kill all the soldiers at the location and then attack the school. Sheila and the others use electrified fences and blowtorches to keep the creatures at bay, but it is revealed that McCabe, actually insane, has created the bats to be the ultimate predator, specifically designing them to kill humans. McCabe flees outside, falsely believing that he can control the bats, only to be killed himself.

When Sheila, Emmett and Jimmy arrive at the mine the next morning, they are informed by the military that they were not able to turn on the coolant unit, so the plan now is to bomb and gas the mine starting in one hour. Emmett calls the military and tells them that they will be able to activate the unit, but they are unable to get the air strike called off. Sheila decides that one hour is enough time for them to get the coolant unit started, so she and Emmett suit up and enter the mine. Jimmy stays outside to monitor their progress and to blow up the mine entrance should it become necessary. Although they find themselves up to their waists in bat guano, they are successful at starting the coolant. As they make for the exit, the bats pursue them. The moment they exit, Jimmy detonates the explosives, collapsing the mine entrance and trapping the bats inside, freezing them. One final bat survives the freezing temperatures and burrows out of the ground, only to be crushed to death by the group's car as they drive away.

== Cast ==
- Lou Diamond Phillips as Sheriff Emmett Kimsey
- Dina Meyer as Dr. Sheila Casper
- Bob Gunton as Dr. Alexander McCabe
- Leon as Jimmy Sands
- Carlos Jacott as Dr. Tobe Hodge
- David McConnell as Deputy Wesley Munn
- Marcia Dangerfield as Mayor Amanda Branson
- Oscar Rowland as Dr. Swanbeck
- Tim Whitaker as Quint
- Juliana Johnson as Emma
- James Sie as Sergeant James
- Ned Bellamy as Major Reid
- George Gerdes as Chaswick
- Joel Farar as Bartender
- Grady Justice as Army Soldier
- Kurt Woodruff as Major #2

== Production ==
In May 1999, it was reported Lou Diamond Phillips would star in the John Logan scripted film Bats for Destination Films.

== Release ==
The film premiered in the United States on October 22, 1999. In its opening weekend, Bats grossed about $4.7 million. It grossed $10.2 million in the US.

The film was released on VHS and DVD on February 22, 2000.

== Reception ==
On the review aggregator website Rotten Tomatoes, 17% of 41 critics' reviews are positive, with an average rating of 3.8/10. The website's consensus reads: "Neither scary nor creepy." Metacritic, which uses a weighted average, assigned the film a score of 23 out of 100, based on 26 critics, indicating "generally unfavorable" reviews.

== Sequel ==
A TV movie sequel to this film, Bats: Human Harvest, was made by the Sci-Fi Channel in 2007.
