= Retroactive (film) =

- DVD cover
- Directed by: Louis Morneau
- Story by: Michael Hamilton-Wright; Robert Strauss; Phillip Badger
- Produced by: Jeffrey D. Ivers; David Bixler; Brad Krevoy; Michael Nadeau; Steven Stabler
- Starring: James Belushi; Kylie Travis; Shannon Whirry; Frank Whaley; Jesse Borrego; M. Emmet Walsh
- Cinematography: George Mooradian
- Edited by: Glenn Garland
- Music by: Tim Truman
- Distributed by: Orion Pictures
- Release date: January 1, 1997
- Running time: 91 minutes
- Country: United States
- Language: English

Retroactive is a 1997 adventure science fiction action film directed by Louis Morneau starring James Belushi, Kylie Travis and Frank Whaley.

== Plot ==
Karen Warren, a former criminal psychologist, is driving on a lonely Texan road in the desert when her car breaks down. She hitches a ride with Frank Lloyd, who is traveling with his abused wife, Rayanne Lloyd, on his way to sell stolen computer chips. They are briefly stopped by a state trooper who gives Frank a ticket for speeding, and are passed on the road by a tow truck driver. They make a stop at a gas station belonging to Frank's friend, Sam, who gives Frank evidence of Rayanne's cheating on him with the tow truck driver, Jesse. Tensions rise; Frank shoots Rayanne and attempts the same with Karen, but Karen escapes into the desert where she stumbles upon a laboratory where Brian, a scientist, is testing a time machine on mice. The machine goes off by accident, sending Karen back to where she was twenty minutes earlier.

Karen awakes in Frank's car, just after she was picked up. This time when the trooper stops their car, Karen asks the state trooper for help, which causes the situation to worsen — Frank kills Rayanne, the state trooper and Jesse. Karen escapes to the laboratory, where she explains to Brian what she knows. They agree to go back in time together, so Brian can call the police on Frank.

Karen awakes in Frank's car and takes his gun, causing a struggle. Rayanne reveals a gun of her own, but misses when she tries to shoot Frank. Despite Karen's preemptive knowledge, Frank kills Rayanne, Jesse, the state trooper and the vacationing parents of a boy named Paul (Robbie Thibaut Jr.). Brian, who was unable to convince the police to come, arrives on the scene and explains to Frank about the time machine. Frank, using Paul as a hostage, forces Brian to send them back in time.

Frank and Paul awake ten minutes earlier, in the middle of the fight. Paul helps Karen, but he and his parents are killed. When Brian arrives, Karen tells him that they have to go back again. They return to the laboratory, chased by Frank, but succeed in overloading the whole system to go back 60 minutes.

Karen awakes in her car, before Frank has picked her up. When Frank and Rayanne drive by, Karen politely refuses a lift. The state trooper comes by next, and Karen warns him about Frank. Brian then arrives to pick Karen up, and they arrive at the gas station after it's all over: Frank has killed Sam and Jesse, and has been shot dead by Rayanne, who is arrested by the state trooper.

== Cast ==
- James Belushi as Frank Lloyd
- Kylie Travis as Karen Warren
- Shannon Whirry as Rayanne Lloyd
- Frank Whaley as Brian
- Jesse Borrego as Jesse
- M. Emmet Walsh as Sam
- Sherman Howard as State Trooper Parker
- Guy Boyd as Bud
- Kristina Coggins as Martha
- Robbie Thibaut Jr. as Paul
- Roger Clinton as Truck Driver

== Production ==
The film is the first of two directed by Morneau and starring Belushi, before Made Men (1999).

== Reception ==
Review aggregation website Rotten Tomatoes gives the film a score of 57% with an average rating of 5/10 based on 7 reviews.

Geoff Andrew from Time Out states: "With its explosive action, black comedy and far-fetched sci-fi imposed on an otherwise vaguely plausible crime thriller, this modest indie film is reminiscent of such low budget '80s exploiters as Tremors and the work of Charles Band. Like the most memorable of these, it's lifted out of the rut by a quirky, imaginative script. True, Belushi's performance is overbearing and M. Emmet Walsh turns in yet another sweaty cameo; true, too, that the frequent visual emphasis on Travis' cleavage flags the movie's compromised ambitions. Nevertheless, there's more than enough energy, bravado and invention to engage the attention throughout."

== See also ==
- List of films featuring time loops
