= Plaguers =

- Plaguers film poster
- Directed by: Brad Sykes
- Written by: Brad Sykes
- Produced by: Josephina Sykes
- Starring: Steve Railsback; Alexis Zibolis
- Cinematography: Scott Spears
- Edited by: Brad Jacques
- Music by: Terry Huud
- Production company: Nightfall Pictures
- Distributed by: Image Entertainment
- Release date: September 8, 2008 (Semana)
- Running time: 86 minutes
- Country: United States
- Language: English

Plaguers is a 2008 American science-fiction horror film written and directed by Brad Sykes and featuring Steve Railsback.

== Plot ==
Tarver (Steve Railsback) is a crew member on board Pandora, a freight transport carrier headed toward Earth with a desperately needed new energy supply, a strange substance called "Thanatos". Pandora's captain, Darian Holoway (Alexis Zibolis) was recently promoted after the death of former captain Rubini (David P. Johnson). Some of the crew are suspicious of the Thanatos. Approaching Earth, the ship diverts to respond to a distress call from the spacecraft Diana. The Diana appears abandoned until the discovery of four nurses from the Diana's medical facility who claim to have survived a pirate attack. The nurses are actually the pirates and they attempt a takeover of the Pandora. During the struggles, the Thanatos container is ruptured and fluid spills onto one of the pirates. She mutates and becomes a "plaguer". One by one, the pirates and the Pandora crew become infected, as the Thanatos becomes strong enough to take control of the ship and head it straight toward Earth.

== Cast ==
- Steve Railsback as Tarver
- Noelle Perris as Kyra
- Alexis Zibolis as Holloway
- Jared Cohn as Riley (as Jared Michaels)
- Paige La Pierre as Sadie
- Bobby James as Mason
- Stepanie Skewes as Nola
- Chad Nell as Briggs
- Maija Polsley as Landon
- Erica Browne as Alida
- David P. Johnson as Rubini

== Background ==
Writer/director Brad Sykes included certain elements that were reminiscent of Alien. His reference points in writing the film were Aliens, Prince of Darkness, and The Thing. He said he "liked how the characters didn't die, but were transformed into something alien or inhuman as the story progressed." Sykes also said that Italian film director Lamberto Bava's Dèmoni (also known as Demons) influenced the actions of the plaguers themselves and that he loves "the wild energy of Italian horror films and tried to bring that into the film whenever possible." He even told his cast to watch Dèmoni for inspiration.

== Reception ==
Quiet Earth wrote that Plaguers is a "scifi horror film that wants to be Alien but comes off feeling like another in a long line of Alien 'homages'."

In its review of the film, DVD Talk said there "are a lot of problems with Plaguers, though it does have some merit", offering that there were "occasional scattered moments of actual tension, and a few effective jump scares", and that "makeup effects are for the most part lots of fun..."

DVD Verdict said, "Plaguers is a 'so bad it's bad' film that explores the space zombie territory with little regard for common sense or science fiction", concluding that the film "doesn't qualify for camp or cult classic, it's just flat out terrible and would be embarrassing for even a public access channel to put on their schedule."

== Awards and nomination ==
=== Wins ===
- Four awards at ShockerFest International Film Festival (2008):
  - Larry Stanley "B-Movie" Award
  - Best Actor (Steve Railsback)
  - Honorable Mention as Best Actress (Alexis Zibolis)
  - Science Fiction Genre Award – Honorable Mention as Best Picture – Feature
- Silver Unicorn for Best Screenplay at Estepona Fantasy and Horror International Film Festival, Spain (2008)
- Best Sci-Fi/Fantasy Film at Mid-Ohio-Con Indie Film Festival (2008)

=== Nominations ===
- Two nominations at Mail Order Zombie's Dead Letter Awards (2009):
  - Best Special Effects
  - Best One-Liner ("There's only one captain on this ship, and today it ain't you.")
