= Central Park West (TV series) =

- Also known as: CPW
- Genre: Soap opera
- Created by: Darren Star
- Written by: Camille Marchetta; Terri Minsky; Darren Star; David Stenn; Adriana Trigiani
- Starring: Mädchen Amick; Justin Lazard; Ron Leibman; John Barrowman; Lauren Hutton; Kylie Travis; Tom Verica; Melissa Errico; Michael Michele; Mariel Hemingway; Raquel Welch
- Theme music composer: Tim Truman (season 1); Michael Gore (season 2)
- Composer: Tim Truman
- Country of origin: United States
- Original language: English
- No. of seasons: 2
- No. of episodes: 21

Production
- Executive producer: Darren Star
- Producer: Judith Stevens
- Cinematography: Geoffrey Erb
- Editors: R.Q. Lovett; Joanna C. Lovetti; David Ray; Cara Silverman
- Running time: 60 minutes
- Production companies: Darren Star Productions; CBS Entertainment Productions (1995; season 1); CBS Productions (1995–1996; seasons 1–2)

Original release
- Network: CBS
- Release: September 13, 1995 – June 28, 1996

Central Park West (also known as CPW) is an American prime time television soap opera that ran from September 1995 to June 1996 on CBS. The series was created and executive produced by Darren Star. As the title suggests, CPW was set in New York, in the affluent Central Park West area of Manhattan. Mariel Hemingway, Mädchen Amick, and Kylie Travis portrayed three of the central characters on the show.

The program represented CBS's attempt to reestablish itself after a disastrous 1994-95 television season where the network lost a heavy amount of established affiliates due to affiliation switches related to Fox acquiring NFC football rights, and an attempt by the network to attract younger viewers. It was the network's most-promoted new show in many years with a promotional campaign exclusively produced to appeal to younger viewers, and attempted to recapture the network's past nighttime soap glory from the years of Dallas and Knots Landing. Australian singer and actress Kylie Minogue was offered a lead role, but declined.

The series was not successful and was removed from CBS' schedule in November 1995, returning some months later with new additions made to the cast (Hemingway left by this point, and Raquel Welch was brought in). The retooling was not enough to save the show, which was canceled in June 1996. The failure of the series returned the network quickly back to their traditional broadcasting focus and repairing relations between both the network's new affiliates and their older stations which were frustrated by the network's moves in programming rights and programming within the Laurence Tisch era, which would end shortly thereafter with Westinghouse's purchase of CBS, Inc. in 1995 (approval of CPW to be placed on the network's schedule came well before Westinghouse's purchase).

== Synopsis ==
Central Park West premiered on September 13, 1995, and aired Wednesdays from 9:00 - 10:00 p.m. With a cast headlined by Mariel Hemingway, Central Park West centered around the glamorous and exciting life of the staff of trendy magazine Communique, owned by Allen Rush (Ron Leibman), "the Darth Vader of publishing". Mariel Hemingway played the role of Stephanie Wells, the newly appointed editor-in-chief of Communique. Central to the plot is the rivalry between Stephanie and Allen's stepdaughter Carrie Fairchild (Mädchen Amick), a scheming young woman who does her best to seduce Stephanie's writer husband Mark Merrill (Tom Verica). The series followed several other ambitious New Yorkers, as well as the evil and deceitful Australian bombshell Rachel Dennis (Kylie Travis), the new fashion editor at Communique.

== Reception ==
Central Park West was initially geared towards Generation X viewers and was heavily promoted by CBS. The series failed to draw in viewers and was put on hiatus in November 1995. Central Park West was then revamped in an effort to attract older viewers. Mariel Hemingway's character was written out of the series, and Gerald McRaney, Noelle Beck and Raquel Welch joined the cast. Retitled CPW, the revamped version, which consisted of eight episodes, began airing June 1996, Wednesdays and Fridays from 10:00 - 11:00 p.m. The changes were unsuccessful as CBS canceled the series on June 28, 1996.

== Canadian Broadcast ==
Throughout the run, the show was Also simulcast on CBC Television.

== Cast ==
=== Main ===
- Mädchen Amick as Carrie Fairchild, columnist at Communique
- John Barrowman as Peter Fairchild, Carrie's brother, ambitious lawyer
- Melissa Errico as Alex Bartoli, Peter's love interest, working class reporter from Staten Island
- Lauren Hutton as Linda Fairchild-Rush, Carrie and Peter's mother, socialite
- Justin Lazard as Gil Chase, Peter's friend, stockbroker
- Michael Michele as Nikki Sheridan, Carrie's friend, art gallery owner, Allen's mistress
- Tom Verica as Mark Merrill, struggling writer, Stephanie's husband
- Mariel Hemingway as Stephanie Wells (season 1), editor-in-chief at Communique
- Kylie Travis as Rachel Dennis (episodes 3–21), Australian fashion editor at Communique
- Noelle Beck as Jordan Tate (season 2), Adam and Dianna's daughter
- Raquel Welch as Dianna Brock (season 2), Adam's ex-wife
- Gerald McRaney as Adam Brock (season 2, guest star in season 1), the new owner of Communique

=== Recurring ===
- Ron Leibman as Allen Rush, the original owner of Communique, Carrie and Peter's stepfather, Linda's husband
- Michael Reilly Burke as Tyler Brock (season 2), Adam and Dianna's son

== Episodes ==
=== Season 1 (1995) ===
No. overall	No. in season	Title	Directed by	Written by	Original release date
1	1	"Stephanie and the Wolves"	Allan Arkush	Darren Star	September 13, 1995
Successful editor Stephanie Wells moves from Seattle to a fancy, luxurious apartment in Central Park West along with her writer husband Mark Merrill. She's been offered a job as the editor of the trendy magazine "Communique", owned by the very wealthy Allen Rush. Allen is married to Linda Fairchild Rush and the stepfather of her grown-up children, Peter and Carrie. Carrie writes a column for "Communique" for a ridiculously high salary and her bitchy attitude immediately gets her in conflict with her new boss, Stephanie. Peter, however, has a very successful career as a lawyer at the district attorney's office and is doing good. His good friend, Gil Chase, works a broker and dumps his girlfriend Deanne Landers after he's thrown away all her money on a bad investment. She then shows up at his work and promises to get him back. Peter, Gil, Carrie, and their friend, Nikki Sheridan, a talent SoHo art gallery owner, play softball in a park and are joined in the game by beautiful Alex Bartoli. She and Peter later walk around in Central Park West and seem to fall instantly in love. Allen has arranged for Mark to get a teaching job at a respectable school but Mark feels the school board is giving him the job as a favor to Allen and not because of his abilities. Deanne sues the company Gil works for. Peter and Alex have a romantic dinner together and are photographed. Carrie arranges a party for Stephanie. There is of course a hidden agenda; Mark is also present and Carrie goes out of her way to seduce him by pretending she's a big fan of his writing. Deanne's lawsuit goes nowhere but she's not planning to let Gil get off that easily. Alex turns out to be a journalist. The picture of her and Peter and everything he's said to her is to get printed on the first page of the newspaper she works for. She feels guilty, though, because she's fallen for him. Carrie makes progress with Mark and he lets her read the play he's working on.
2	2	"Chess Moves"	Allan Arkush	Darren Star	September 20, 1995
Alex tries in vain to convince her editor John to drop the article on Peter. Tired of Carrie's intrigues, Stephanie drops her column. A vengeful Carrie goes to Mark and tells him she's got a producer for his play. Deanne shows up at Gil's apartment, takes off her clothes and says she's willing to forgive him. Gill pulls back at the last minute and Deanne swears a terrible revenge. Stephanie is arranging a party but Mark can't attend as he's meeting with Carrie about the production of his play. Stephanie thinks Carrie's intentions are rotten. Carrie tells Mark that she is the producer interested in the play and convinces him to go along with the plan. Linda suspects Allen of cheating with Stephanie. Gil takes a sexy model, Monique, home with him to have sex. However, Deanne still has a key to Gil's flat and goes there and pretends she is Gil's girlfriend. Peter and Alex are falling very much in love. Alex reveals the truth as the article on Peter hits the newsstand. The article includes much material on a secret investigation of the mayor's office that Peter had confided in Alex. Peter doesn't want to see her again. Carrie and Peter eat dinner with Allen and Linda. Carrie wants Allen to give her $250,000 to produce Mark's play and it ends with a fight. Peter and Alex both want reconciliation but everything seems to work against it. With the truth about the investigation of the mayor's office out, Peter's boss, D.A. Jack Collins, takes him off the case. Nikki has an affair with Allen. Deanne can't afford her apartment after Gil has thrown away all her money so she forces Gil to let her move in with him.
3	3	"The Best, False Friend"	James Frawley	David Stenn	September 27, 1995
Gil calls the cops on Deanne but the police have a hard time believing that Deanne is keeping him "hostage" in his own apartment. Stephanie hires fancy fashion editor Rachel Dennis from London to work at "Communique". Rachel, who has just divorced from her husband in London, turns out to be an old friend of Carrie's and she is to stay in Carrie's apartment until she finds her own. Since all of City Hall knows about the investigation of the mayor's office, Jack wants Peter to see Alex again and fool her to print wrongful information about the investigation to throw everyone off track. Reluctantly, Peter takes Alex out to dinner and gives her the fake information. Gil comes home and finds his apartment stripped as Deanne has run off and given all his stuff to the Salvation Army. But that's not all: Deanne has the code to Gil's computer at work, and causes massive problems for him. Carrie warns Stephanie that Rachel is after her job and shouldn't be trusted. Stephanie refuses to believe her. Meanwhile, Carrie hires a theater to produce Mark's play. When Rachel learns Carrie is producing the play, she runs to Stephanie and informs her that Carrie cannot possibly produce the play as she has no money except her "Communique" salary. Steph looks into it and discovers that the theater Carrie allegedly booked hasn't heard of her. A guilt-ridden Peter warns Alex about the scam he's pulled on her. But she doesn't believe him and prints the story. This results in "The Globe" having to print a first-page retraction when they learn they've been set up, and a furious John fires Alex. Gil locates Deanne and threatens her to finally leave him alone. Nikki is not too thrilled about her affair with Allen. While Steph works late, Carrie drops by Mark. She acts very seductive and starts kissing him but Mark breaks it off. Unnoticed to him, Carrie places her earring on Steph's night stand.
4	4	"Days of Thunder"	Tim Hunter	Adriana Trigiani	October 8, 1995
Stephanie discovers Carrie's earring. She keeps it from Mark and instead returns it to Carrie at work and forces her to tell Mark she's unable to produce the play. Peter and Gil meet Rachel. Gil is very attracted to her but Rachel completely ignores him in favor of Peter. Carrie arranges a stage reading of Mark's play at a theater in the Hamptons. Mark must go there alone with Carrie because Stephanie can't come as she has arranged an urgent meeting with Allen about several circulation figures full of discrepancies she's found. But when she tells Allen he gets mad and orders her to stay off. Rachel tries to build up a friendship with Steph but secretly accesses the "Communique" computers and leaks information on the circulation figures. Desperate to get acquainted with Rachel, Gil tags along to the Hamptons. However, Rachel instead opts to go to a banquet where Peter will be attending. Alex is serving people drinks at the banquet. She is embarrassed but Peter convinces her to meet with him later. However, Rachel treats Alex like a servant and manages to sabotage this meeting. At the celebration of Mark's play at her family's cottage, Carrie lures Mark into the pool where she rips off his boxers. But Mark manages to avoid temptation again. Nikki breaks it off with Allen and he yells at her she can kiss her gallery goodbye. The news on the discrepancies has leaked to the press and Allen advises Stephanie to find the leak ASAP. Carrie realizes Rachel is after Peter and informs her Peter is off limits to her.
5	5	"Intrigues"	Allan Arkush	Terri Minsky	October 11, 1995
Peter asks Allen a favor; get Alex rehired at "The Globe". At "Communique", Steph does her best to catch the leak. She suspects Carrie of being the culprit. Rachel continues her sabotaging at 'Communique', making Stephanie look incompetent. Mark and Stephanie's old friend Danny arrives in New York on a business trip. Danny is launching a new line of sportswear and lets "Communique" do the advertising. Rachel contacts Allen and tries to convince him Stephanie is the leak. Mark gets contacted by Ian Walker, an acclaimed theater producer, who wants to produce his play. He offers Mark $10,000 to option the play but Mark feels torn since Carrie is already producing. After pressure from the almighty Allen, several of Nikki's biggest clients remove their art from her gallery. Peter finally manages to reconcile with Alex. A jealous Rachel tells Alex she only got her job back because of Peter. Alex doesn't want more to do with Peter but he refuses to give up in the end she has to give in. Nikki begs Allen to leave her alone before he ruins her business. Steph manages to convince Mark to forget his guilt and use Ian as his producer. However, Carrie doesn't handle these news very well. Upset that Peter and Alex are back together, Rachel sleeps with Gil. The next morning she gives him the third degree about what Peter likes and forbids him to breathe a word about their night of passion. It turns out Ian has been hired by Stephanie. The $10,000 for the option came from her.
6	6	"Lunar Eclipse"	Lorraine Senna	Darren Star	October 18, 1995
Mark wakes up from a sexual fantasy about Carrie. Stephanie arranges monitoring of all the computers and gives out key cards in her attempt to catch the leak. Allen apologizes to Nikki and convinces her to come back to him as he reveals he's about to divorce Linda. Mark has several new ideas for his play and is upset that it seems to be nearly impossible to get in touch with Ian. Rachel seduces Gil to learn more about Peter. Stephanie clashes with one of her editors, Tom Chasen, over an article she won't print. Rachel asks Peter to help her with her temporary visa which is about to expire. Mark forces himself into a meeting with Ian. Ian calls Stephanie and orders her to get Mark to back off. Rachel tries to discourage Alex about her relationship with Peter. Alex convinces John to let her dig up dirt on Rachel for a story to The Globe. Rachel continues to scheme by making sure Tom's bashed article gets printed in the next issue of 'Communique'. She has used Carrie's key card. Worried that Allen is leaving her for a mistress, Linda contacts Nikki and asks her to sell a valuable Renoir painting for her. Steph fires Carrie when she learns her key card was used to access the office. Alex learns Rachel had to quit her job in London due to several scandals and a marriage full of infidelity. Rachel feels threatened but promises to get to Alex first.
7	7	"When I Deceive You..."	Victoria Hochberg	David Stenn	November 1, 1995
Following Carrie's dismissal and the rumors about false circulation figures at "Communique", John assigns Alex and gossip columnist Lisa Monroe to write a story about it. Lisa has big sources inside "Communique" but Alex has a hard time getting people to talk. Allen and Linda celebrate their 13th anniversary but after a fight with Carrie, he leaves to "celebrate" with Nikki instead. After a "Communique" reviewer gives one of his plays a bad review, Ian confronts Stephanie with breaking their deal and threatens to tell all to Mark the truth. Alex asks Allen about Carrie dismissal. Furious, he throws her out and orders Peter to get her to back off. Rachel goes ballistic when she learns her divorce settlement has gone straight to hell because her infidelity is on tape. Gil discusses investments with Stephanie and Mark. Later, Mark goes through their finances and finds the $10,000 debit on Stephanie's private account. Steph lies about where the money went to but Mark later finds out she's been untruthful. Peter is visited by Rachel, who's full of self pity after her divorce settlement. She tries to kiss him but he breaks away. Alex is surprised when Lisa refuses to write about Rachel's divorce and figures Rachel must be the source at "Communique" and thereby the leak. Alex tells Carrie, who confronts Rachel and throws her out. She demands Rachel to get her rehired or else she'll splatter her divorce business all over every paper. Gil finds out for Mark that the $10,000 from Steph's account went to Ian. An enraged Mark confronts Stephanie and she admits she paid Ian to option his play. Mark rushes off to Carrie's penthouse and sleeps with her.
8	8	"With the Weapons of a Mrs."	Allan Arkush	Terri Minsky	November 8, 1995
Mark and Stephanie's marriage is rocky as Mark can't bring himself to forgive her. At work, Stephanie clashes with Tom Chasen again over an article she refuses to print. Rachel meets with Tom and promises to get him a much better job at British Vogue if he confesses to being the leak. Tom agrees and confesses to Steph, who reluctantly has to rehire Carrie. Nikki informs Linda she's found an anonymous buyer that will purchase the Renoir for $10 million. Carrie forces Steph to make her an executive editor. After another romantic evening, Peter and Alex have sex for the first time. Mark unwillingly ends up in bed with Carrie again. Carrie is planning a surprise birthday party for Peter but Rachel learns about these plans and manages to get Peter with her to dinner so he never finds out about the party. She even tells him she loves him but Peter remains loyal to Alex. Nikki visits Allen to end their affair once and for all, only to discover that he is the anonymous buyer of the Renoir. Gil and Carrie confront Rachel with ruining the surprise party. Allen reveals to Linda that he knows she's tried to sell the Renoir to get the money to leave him. They discover that there are still some old feelings left and they reconcile. Mark and Steph reconcile too but he hasn't forgotten about Carrie.
9	9	"The History of Gil and Rachel"	Victoria Hochberg	Darren Star & Terri Minsky	November 15, 1995
Linda wonders who Allen's mistress is. Gil confesses to Peter that Rachel has been using him to get to Peter. During a "Communique" staff meeting, Carrie pitches an idea for an article on reversed migration and suggest Mark as a writer. Steph refuses to let Mark write the piece since it will be a conflict of interest. Nikki struggles to keep her gallery running. Carrie tells Mark that Stephanie didn't want him to write in her magazine. Peter leaves Rachel mad with self pity as explains he has no romantic interest in her whatsoever. Carrie tries to cheer up Nikki by shopping. She tries on an expensive white suit but doesn't buy it. After some discussions, Steph agrees to let Mark write for "Communique". Peter takes Alex to meet Linda and Allen. Linda doesn't approve of Alex at all but Allen seems to take a liking to her. Nikki finds the white suit in her closet; Allen is obviously stalking her. Alex and Peter argue about Linda. Carrie forces Steph to make her editor of Mark's piece. Nikki discovers Allen has put cameras all over her flat. She runs over to Peter's for comfort and ends up sleeping with him. She confesses all about her affair with Allen and Peter goes straight to his stepfather and threatens him to leave Nikki alone. Allen tells Alex that Peter has slept with Nikki. Rachel finds out about Carrie and Mark's affair.
10	10	"Showgirls"	Gwen Arner	David Stenn	UNAIRED
Rachel is thrown out of her fancy hotel since she can't pay her bills. Allen evicts Nikki from her gallery. Alex confronts Peter about sleeping with Nikki. Peter confesses and she dumps him. Rachel rats to Allen about how Stephanie abuses her position to let Mark do a cover story. In lack of a better place to live, Rachel moves in with Gil. Linda goes to buy clothes for a fund raiser and tries the same white suit Nikki tried. The shopkeeper says Allen has already bought this dress but Linda buys it anyway. Rachel tells Carrie she knows about her and Mark. At the fundraiser, Nikki and Linda show up with the same dress. Linda figures Nikki is Allen's mistress and soaks her in red wine. Alex, who has been sent to cover the event by her new boss Ben, witnesses it all. Mark is getting too jealous and obsessed with Carrie, who starts to get tired and avoids him. Linda decides to get back Nikki's gallery, in return for evidence against Allen so she can get a good divorce settlement. Alex is working on a juicy first-page story on Allen and Nikki's affair but Allen offers her a better story if she drops it. Mark's piece for "Communique" is finished but Stephanie is in distress as it is too bad to be published; Mark's mind must have been elsewhere. Rachel gets hold of the piece and faxes it to Allen as proof that Steph is an incompetent editor-in-chief. Stephanie tells Mark she can't print his piece and he runs off to Carrie and wants to move in with her. Carrie isn't interested in anything serious and dumps him.
11	11	"Behind Your Back"	Allan Arkush	Eric Overmyer	UNAIRED
Nikki provides Linda with receipts, gifts, events and the names of places where she and Allen met. Linda is impressed; now she can nail Allen. Peter teaches a class of law students and gets completely swept away by one of the students; Robin Gaynor. The feeling seems to be mutual. Steph cancels Mark's article and offers him a kill-fee for his trouble but Mark gets very mad. Mark calls Carrie and talks about how much he loves her on her answering machine. Carrie picks up and they argue until Mark says he's had enough and is going back to Stephanie. Carrie uses the tape from the answering machine and records it on the voice-mails of everyone at "Communique". At work, Stephanie is the last to learn about her husband's affair. She rushes into Carrie's office for a heated confrontation. Gil takes Peter to a strip club and to his horror, Peter discovers that Robin is one of the "dancers". Steph confronts Mark and throws him out. Rachel offers her support to Stephanie and convinces her to take some time off at the isolated Rhinebeck Retreat. Peter confronts Robin and she admits she works at the strip club to finance her education. Mark swears a terrible revenge on Carrie. Allen offers Alex a scoop on Royal Island, an island off Manhattan which will soon have Manhattan's very first casino. Alex agrees but she'll do the story objectively, not be his mouth piece. Stephanie leaves for Rhinebeck Retreat and naively leaves the duplicitous Rachel in charge of "Communique". Peter is surprised to see Robin has dropped his law class. During a "Communique" staff meeting, Rachel announces that Stephanie has suffered a nervous breakdown. She orders the upcoming magazine to be changed into an all fashion mag because now she is the boss.
12	12	"She Danced Only One Summer"	Allan Arkush	Terri Minsky	UNAIRED
Rachel spreads the word on Stephanie's "nervous breakdown" to the tabloids. Peter convinces Robin to start dating but she fears he won't handle knowing she works as a stripper. Nikki is approached by Gabe Sands, a bold artist from Boston, who convinces her to display one of his paintings. Pleased with her article, Allen gives Alex expensive gifts. Peter is not as happy and lashes out at Alex for writing the article since Royal Island is a private nature preserve Allen has been trying to get to for years. With Gil's help, Mark finally locates Stephanie at Rhinebeck and pleads with her to come back to him. However, Steph isn't ready to make any decisions. There are big romantic vibes between Gabe and Nikki. Alex finds out Peter is actually the owner of Royal Island. She apologizes and suggests they get back together but is angry to learn that Peter is now seeing Robin. Carrie manages to get hold of Stephanie at the retreat and shows her newspaper clippings about her "breakdown". Carrie says Rachel is behind it but Stephanie doesn't believe her. Melody, a stripper at the club where Robin works, tips The Globe about Peter and Robin's relationship. Alex is assigned to the case and she threatens Robin to dump Peter or else she'll ruin his career at the D.A.'s office by exposing them. Mark thinks Stephanie will forgive him if she hears the entire message from Carrie's answering machine because during the conversation he ended the affair. Mark tries to get the tape from Carrie but in the struggle, Carrie falls. Stephanie heads back to New York. Carrie has Mark arrested for assault.
13	13	"Allen Strikes Back"	Timothy Van Patten	Susan Fales-Hill	UNAIRED
Allen bails out Mark to avoid more scandals and pays Carrie to drop the charges. Stephanie returns, pulls Rachel's new fashion issue and fires her. Gil is approached by mega tycoon Adam Brock, who asks him to quietly buy stocks from Allen's company, Rush Media. Mark is on speaking terms with Stephanie again but she still can't forgive him. Peter tells Alex to stop threatening Robin but Alex reveals she's pregnant. Her pediatrician, Dr. West, confirms it and Alex demands Peter to marry her. Brock tells Gil to contact Linda and see if she's willing to sell her 3% of Rush Media. Rachel gives Allen her pulled fashion magazine and claims it's a much better magazine than Stephanie will ever be able to put together. Allen lets Rachel edit special fashion supplements to 'Communique'. Distressed to still be working with Rachel, Steph sleeps with Mark but later regrets it. Robin quits her job at the strip club. Peter says nothing to her about the baby. Alex goes to Linda and sobs about the pregnancy and Peter's affair with a stripper. Nikki is uncomfortable to discover that Gabe keeps several guns tucked away in his flat. Gabe is in fact a hitman hired by Allen to kill Nikki. Linda orders Peter to marry Alex. Steph delivers a new issue with a cover that says "fashion sucks". It's a huge success and Rachel and her supplement are made a laughing stock. While on top, Stephanie quits her job and moves back to Seattle with Mark. Alex isn't pregnant after all. She has blackmailed Dr. West to go along with her scheme.

=== Season 2 (1996) ===
No. overall	No. in season	Title	Directed by	Written by	Original release date
14	1	"Hour of the Devil"	Lorraine Senna	Darren Star	June 5, 1996
Linda agrees to sell her 3% of Rush Media to Brock. Dr. West inseminates Alex to make her pregnant. Thanks to Linda's stocks, Brock is now able take over Rush Media but instead strikes a deal with Allen; if he gets 'Communique', he'll leave Rush Media alone. Allen agrees. Rachel kisses up to Brock in hopes that he'll make her editor-in-chief of 'Communique'. Nikki is very happy with Gabe but Allen pushes Gabe to go ahead with the hit right away. Peter and Robin are in seventh heaven. Now that Allen knows Linda was going to sell him out, she's in a very uncomfortable position. Brock tries to romance Linda but after what's happened she's not at all interested. Gabe has fallen in love with Nikki and is unable to kill her. Brock dislikes Rachel's attitude towards the rest of the staff. He takes her riding and makes sure are her elegant fashion clothes are covered in mud before he says he'll give her a chance to prove herself as a worthy editor-in-chief of 'Communique'.
15	2	"Guess Who's Come to Annoy You?"	Allan Arkush & Don Scardino	David Stenn	June 7, 1996
Jordan Tate, a junior editor at Ward & Weston, tries to introduce some writers to 'Communique' but Rachel isn't interested and treats her like trash. However, she has a sudden change of heart when she learns Jordan is Brock's daughter. Allen hires a P.I. to dig up dirt on Brock. Brock is introduced to Jordan's boyfriend, struggling actor Randy Boyd, but he isn't overwhelmed. Gabe confesses to Nikki that he's a hitman, paid by Allen to kill her. While Allen sits home, thinking of a way to nail Brock, Linda has an interesting night out with Brock and gets to know him better. Peter wants to be with Robin even though he'll marry Alex. Carrie befriends Jordan and learns how Brock's wife left the family 12 years ago. She now lives in Monte Carlo and owns 25% of Brock's company. Allen is outraged when the P.I. brings him photos of Brock and Linda kissing. Allen confronts Linda and finally she leaves him and moves in with Carrie.
16	3	"Public Execution"	Don Scardino	Terri Minsky	June 12, 1996
Alex forces Peter to let her move into his apartment. She also wants them to consummate the wedding but she has to give up that. Linda tells Brock she isn't ready for a relationship right now yet but he persuades her into a date. Brock has the shock of his life when Dianna pops up in his office and demands him to take her to lunch. Alex talks Linda into throwing her a wedding reception. Rachel takes Jordan to dinner with her and Gil. Jordan and Gil discover they have many things in common and Rachel is left bored and feeling frozen out. Later, Rachel and Gil get into a big argument over this. Dianna decides to go back to Monte Carlo but changes her mind when Allen shows her photos of Brock and Linda - claiming Linda will be the next Mrs. Brock. Dianna tries to worm her way back into the family by visiting Jordan (for the first time in 12 years) but Jordan sees through her mother's tricks. Brock tells Gil to try and convince Dianna to sell him her 25% of the company at whatever price.
17	4	"End of a Marriage"	Gwen Arner	Darren Star	June 14, 1996
Alex is rushed to the hospital, where she blackmails Dr. West to tell Peter she's had a miscarriage. Peter is wrecked with guilt and Alex is happy to discover that he's more sympathetic towards her. After staking his claim in New York with 'Communique', Brock decides to move his entire company - Brock Global Communications - to New York; putting the executive office in the same building as 'Communique'. Brock hires Gil to work for him and assigns him to find out if Dianna will accept the offer to sell her 25% of Brock Global Communications. Dianna demands that Brock deals with her in person, or else she'll dump her stocks on the open market. Carrie is intrigued to learn she has a secret admirer that sends her a note to come to the Zinc Bar. Carrie shows up with Nikki and gets a glass of champagne from the admirer. However, he's put something in it to give it a terrible taste and seems to have vanished. Dianna forces Brock to meet her at Tavern on the Green to discuss the stocks.
18	5	"Out on Bail"	Timothy Van Patten	David Stenn	June 19, 1996
Peter is interrogated by the cops, who are convinced that he has killed Alex after finding out she tricked him about the baby. Things are looking dark and Linda is unable to raise the $2 million bail because Allen has frozen all of her assets until the divorce is settled. Jordan tells Mark that Ward & Weston wants to back his new book. A thrilled Mark lies that his new psycho-thriller book is based on his experiences in New York: he is the only man that Carrie hasn't been able to seduce, so she has done all she can to destroy him. Jordan foolishly believes every word and finds herself attracted to Mark. Linda swallows her pride and begs Allen for bail money but he won't help her with the money unless she sleeps with him. Linda walks away in disgust. Brock finds out there's a new tenant below his apartment: Dianna. He is far from happy but can't do anything about it. A desperate Linda can't stand to see Peter falling apart and despite Carrie's objections, she accepts Allen's deal.
19	6	"Everything Has Its Price"	Victor Lobl	Camille Marchetta	June 21, 1996
Tyler Brock arrives in New York and Dianna at once asks his help to make Brock warm up to her again. Tyler, however, is reluctant as he feels that his father has always considered him to be a nobody. Carrie warns Brock that Mark is bad news for Jordan. A worried Linda sends a P.I. to find Peter. Jordan introduces Tyler to Gil and Rachel. They all seem to have only nice things to say about Brock but Tyler disagrees and gets drunk before going to face his father. Brock doesn't like his behavior at all and throws him out. Carrie goes to the police with her stolen copy of Mark's book but it's not enough evidence for them to do anything. Meanwhile, Mark buys a cute, little puppy and leaves it outside Carrie's apartment. Carrie happily welcomes the puppy into her home. Tyler wants to leave New York but Dianna tells him that Brock does love him. It's just that he has taken Gil under his wings instead, as a substitute for the son he doesn't have anymore.
20	7	"Mermaids Strike Better"	Nancy Malone	Terri Minsky	June 26, 1996
Marshall Dodd announces that he'll make Brock and Allen deliver one bid each. Just one round; highest bidder gets the company. Brock confronts Dianna about her liaison with Allen. Tyler apologizes to Gil but once he has Rachel alone, he starts making the moves on her. Brock assembles a family dinner at the Zinc Bar. Linda brings Carrie along and Jordan brings Mark, who starts groping Carrie underneath the table. Again, Carrie is made looking like the crazy one and rushes off. Later, Carrie violently attacks Mark. The cops take her away and she is put under the psychiatric care of Dr. Kyle Rose, who wants to keep her for observation for 2 months. Tyler feels that Brock neglects him in favor of Gil, so he goes to Dianna and informs her that Gil is in charge of keeping the Starworks bid safe. Dianna arranges for Rachel to work late hours and then drops by Gil's flat. Acting very seductive, she manages to steal the Starworks bid while Gil is on the phone.
21	8	"You Belong to Me"	Don Scardino	Darren Star & David Stenn & Terri Minsky & Camille Marchetta	June 28, 1996
Brock has used too much money to acquire Starworks and realizes Allen may use the opportunity to attempt a hostile take-over. While Allen is working on Brock's board members, Dianna works on getting Tyler to help out with the take-over. She tells Tyler that he will then be given a top position and that Jordan received 2% of Brock Global Communications when she turned 25 while Tyler got nothing. Dr. Rose discharges Carrie. Tyler accesses Gil's computer and sends one of Gil's stockbroker friends a fake e-mail, telling him to buy Brock Global stocks. Realizing that Brock really loves her after all, Linda takes him back. Tyler anonymously tips the press that Gil is involved with insider trading. Bumping into each other at a fancy restaurant, Dianna and Linda start bickering and eventually end up in a wild chick fight in a swimming pool. Carrie goes to her family cottage in the Hamptons and calls Mark, telling him he has managed to drive her away from New York.

== Nielsen ratings ==
Central Park West debuted on Wednesday, September 13, 1995, ranking 61st for the week with 9.7 million viewers and a rating/share of 7.5/12.

Season		U.S. ratings	Network	Rank
1	1995	7.3 million	CBS	#115
2	1996	7.082 million	CBS	N/A

== Awards and nominations ==
Year	Award	Category	Recipient	Result
1996	Emmy Awards	Outstanding Individual Achievement in Main Title Theme Music	Tim Truman	Nominated
1996	Emmy Awards	Outstanding Individual Achievement in Graphic Design and Title Sequences	Paul Newman and Billy Pittard	Nominated
