= A Vaudeville of Devils: Seven Moral Tales =

A Vaudeville of Devils: 7 Moral Tales
- First edition
- Author: Robert Girardi
- Language: English
- Genre: Mystery novel
- Publisher: Delacorte Press
- Publication date: 1999
- Publication place: United States
- Media type: Print (hardcover)
- Pages: 421 pp
- ISBN: 0-385-33398-6
- OCLC: 42359780

A Vaudeville of Devils: 7 Moral Tales is a collection of short stories and novellas by Robert Girardi.

== "The Dinner Party" ==
The short story, loosely set in Portugal, is a synthesis between "The Masque of the Red Death", Our Man in Havana, and Shikasta. It was first published in TriQuarterly Review, Issue 99 (Spring/Summer 1997).

== "The Defenestration of Abu Sid" ==
A crime, or detective novella about the Washington D.C. public defender Martin Wexler, and his personal growth defending a sociopathic gangster.

== "Sunday Evenings at Contessa Pasquali's" ==
A mystery novella about the expatriate American Billy, who has settled in Naples and the Contessa's Sunday night soirees. "Vedi Napoli e poi muori."
