= Kylie Travis =

English-born Australian actress

- Born: 27 April 1970 (age 56); London, England
- Occupation: Actor
- Years active: 1992–2001
- Spouse: Louis R. Cappelli

Kylie Travis (born 27 April 1970) is an English-born Australian former actress known for her leading role in the soap opera Central Park West.

== Early life ==
Travis was born in London, England, the oldest of four sisters. After her birth, her family moved to Australia. She modelled for various agencies in Paris, London, and New York City before taking up acting.

== Career ==
Travis' first major role was in the Aaron Spelling soap opera Models Inc. where she played the part of Julie, a vindictive yet loyal model. After the show was cancelled, she was approached by Darren Star, creator of Melrose Place, from which Models Inc was a spin-off, to star in his new prime time drama Central Park West, in which she played scheming fashion editor, Rachel Dennis.

She then went on to play parts in several motion pictures, including Retroactive, Sanctuary as Rachel Malcolm, and Gia.

== Personal life ==
Travis is married to Louis R. Cappelli, a property developer active in Westchester County, New York.

== Filmography ==
=== Film ===
| Year | Title | Role | Notes |
|---|---|---|---|
| 1992 | Eye of the Beholder | Holly Brandon | |
| 1995 | Father of the Bride Part II | Girl on Car | Uncredited |
| 1996 | For Which He Stands | Drunk Girl | |
| 1997 | Retroactive | Karen Warren | |
| 1998 | Sanctuary | Rachel Malcolm | |

=== Television ===
| Year | Title | Role | Notes |
|---|---|---|---|
| 1994 | Renegade | Bobbie | Episode: "Hard Rider" |
| 1994 | Tarzán | Starr Reilly | Episode: "Tarzan and the Rock Star" |
| 1994–1995 | Models Inc. | Julie Dante | 29 episodes |
| 1995–1996 | Central Park West | Rachel Dennis | 18 episodes |
| 1998 | Gia | Stephanie, Model | Television film |
| 2001 | Ed | Tanya | Episode: "Prom Night" |
