= House of Pride =

Canadian television programme

House of Pride is a Canadian television soap opera, which aired on CBC Television from 1974 to 1976.

The series opened with the death of family patriarch Dan Pride (George Waite), and focused on the families of his five adult children. Each of the families lived in a different Canadian city; the series had production units in Vancouver, Winnipeg, Toronto, Montreal and Halifax.

The cast included Charmion King, Lynne Griffin, Budd Knapp, Linda Sorenson, Colin Fox, Murray Westgate and Sébastien Dhavernas.
