= Robert Girardi =

American writer

- Born: Robert Girardi; November 18, 1961 (age 64); Springfield, Virginia, U.S.
- Education: University of Virginia; University of Iowa (MFA)
- Occupation: Writer
- Writing career
- Genres: Mystery fiction, Detective fiction, essays
- Notable works: Madeleine's Ghost The Pirate's Daughter: A Novel of Adventure; Vaporetto 13; A Vaudeville of Devils: Seven Moral Tales; The Wrong Doyle Gorgeous East

Robert Girardi (born November 18, 1961) is an American writer of mystery fiction and detective stories.

== Early life and education ==
Girardi was born in on November 18, 1961, in Springfield, Virginia, and educated in Catholic schools in Europe. He majored in studio art at the University of Virginia in Charlottesville, Virginia and was first published during his undergraduate years in the Virginia Literary Review. After briefly attending the Graduate Film School of the University of Southern California, he transferred to the University of Iowa. He graduated from the Iowa Writer's Workshop at the university with a Master of Fine Arts degree in fiction writing in 1986. He also received the James Mitchener Fellowship in 1989.

== Career ==
Girardi worked at numerous odd jobs, writing seven unpublished novels and several unproduced screenplays, before the publication of Madeleine's Ghost in 1995. An editor for Delacorte Press found the manuscript on a friend's coffee table and fell in love with the story. "If I hadn't been published, I would have gone mad. I was getting very bitter. I don't know what I would have done. I would probably have joined the priesthood."

Madeleine's Ghost was followed by novels Vaporetto 13 (1997) and The Pirate's Daughter (1997), a collection of novellas and short stories titled A Vaudeville of Devils: Seven Moral Tales, and an autobiographical piece for the Washingtonian about his 'spooky' upbringing. He returned to Hollywood with his teleplays for Judging Amy in 2001 and Joan of Arcadia in 2004. Barbara Hall, an old friend, named the family in Joan of Arcadia "Girardi" after him. A film adaptation of Vaporetto 13 was optioned by Warner/Di Novi, and in 2003, Roland Joffé was ready to start filming his novella "Sunday Evenings at Contessa Pasquali's"; neither film was made.

Girardi returned to mystery fiction in 2002 with The Wrong Doyle, published by small British imprint Sceptre. After Bertelsmann acquired Random House in 1998, Girardi's usual imprint Delacorte was repositioned as a young readers' imprint, and his books went out of print. Girardi was the Spring 2008 writer-in-residence at Goucher College in Towson, Maryland His manuscripts are held at Georgetown University.

== Bibliography ==
=== Novels ===
- Madeleine's Ghost, Delacorte Press (New York, NY), 1995.
- The Pirate's Daughter: A Novel of Adventure, Delacorte Press (New York, NY), 1997.
- Vaporetto 13: A Novel, Delacorte Press (New York, NY), 1997.
- A Vaudeville of Devils: Seven Moral Tales, Delacorte Press (New York, NY), 1999.
- The Wrong Doyle, Sceptre (London, England), 2002, Justin, Charles (Boston, MA), 2004.
- Gorgeous East, St. Martin's Press, October 13, 2009, ISBN 978-0-312-56586-2

=== Magazine articles and short stories ===
- "Nose Job", The New Republic (November 13, 1995)
- "The Dinner Party", TriQuarterly, Issue 99 (Spring/Summer 1997)
- "Spooks on the Roof", Washingtonian (April 2000)

=== Teleplays ===
- "Imbroglio", Judging Amy, (2001)
- "Vanity, Thy Name is Human", Joan of Arcadia (First Aired 5/07/2004)

== See also ==
- List of Catholic authors
