= Erika Anderson =

American film and television actress

- Occupations: Actress, model
- Years active: 1987–2000
- Spouse: Richard Butler (m. 2020)

Erika Anderson is a retired American film and television actress best known for her roles in Zandalee (1991), A Nightmare on Elm Street 5: The Dream Child (1989) and Twin Peaks (1990). She married Richard Butler on September 22, 2020.

== Life and career ==
Anderson grew up in Tulsa, Oklahoma, the daughter of a sculptor. She attended Nathan Hale High School and the University of Tulsa, graduating with a major in telecommunications and a minor in theater. While in school, she worked as a disc jockey at Tulsa's only jazz radio station and also began working in television, eventually hosting her own arts program.

After college, she moved to Los Angeles to pursue a career in radio and television. She signed with a modeling agency and worked steadily in New York City, Paris, Milan, and Los Angeles. She appeared in fashion layouts in magazines such as Vogue and Interview. While in Italy, she played the lead in a short experimental film about an Italian vision of the United States called Through Your Eyes.

Her first role in a full-length movie was in the 1988 movie Lifted, and her breakthrough role came in 1989 in the horror movie A Nightmare on Elm Street 5: The Dream Child as Greta Gibson. Anderson appeared in three TV episodes of Twin Peaks, portraying Selina Swift, an actress who played twin sisters Emerald and Jade in a fictitious soap opera within the series. She starred in the 1991 erotic suspense thriller Zandalee with Nicolas Cage, Judge Reinhold, and Joe Pantoliano. The cast delivered such captivating performances that the movie has garnered a cult following. In 1991, she starred in the suspense thriller Shadows of the Past as Jackie Delaney with Nicholas Campbell. In 1995, she starred with Scott Valentine in Object of Obsession as Margaret, a woman taken hostage by her mysterious new lover. Her last movie was in 2000 in the film Ascension.

Anderson has made many guest appearances on TV shows from Silk Stalkings, Dream On, Twin Peaks, to Red Shoe Diaries (Liar's Tale). The 5-foot 11-inch brunette modeled for various fashion magazines, as well as for photographers Helmut Newton, Douglas Sutter, and sculptor Robert Graham. She has appeared on the cover of at-least five magazines. In 2010 Anderson appeared in Never Sleep Again: The Elm Street Legacy. Anderson was also featured in articles in such magazines as the May 1991 Premiere Magazine, (pages 38–42) by Phoebe Hoban, the January 1991 Elle, as well as ITC Entertainment's press kit for the 1991 film Zandalee.

In 2020, Anderson married Richard Butler, the English lead singer of The Psychedelic Furs.

== Filmography ==
Year	Title	Role	Notes
1987	Protect and Surf	Betty	Television film
1989	Christine Cromwell		Television series Episode: "Easy Come, Easy Go"
1989	A Nightmare on Elm Street 5: The Dream Child	Greta Gibson	Feature film
1990	Twin Peaks	Selena Swift / Jade / Emerald	Television series; recurring role
1991	Shadows of the Past	Jackie Delaney	Television film
1991	Visitors from the Unknown	Nordic Alien	Television film
1991	Zandalee	Zandalee Martin	Feature film
1993	Quake	Jenny	Video
1993	Red Shoe Diaries	Jo	Television series Episode: "Liar's Tale"
1995	Object of Obsession	Margaret	Feature film
1996	Club VR	Shula	Direct-to-video
1998	October 22	Maggie	Feature film
1999	Ballad of the Nightingale	Isadora	Feature film
2000	Ascension	Sarah	Feature film
