= Steve Railsback =

American actor

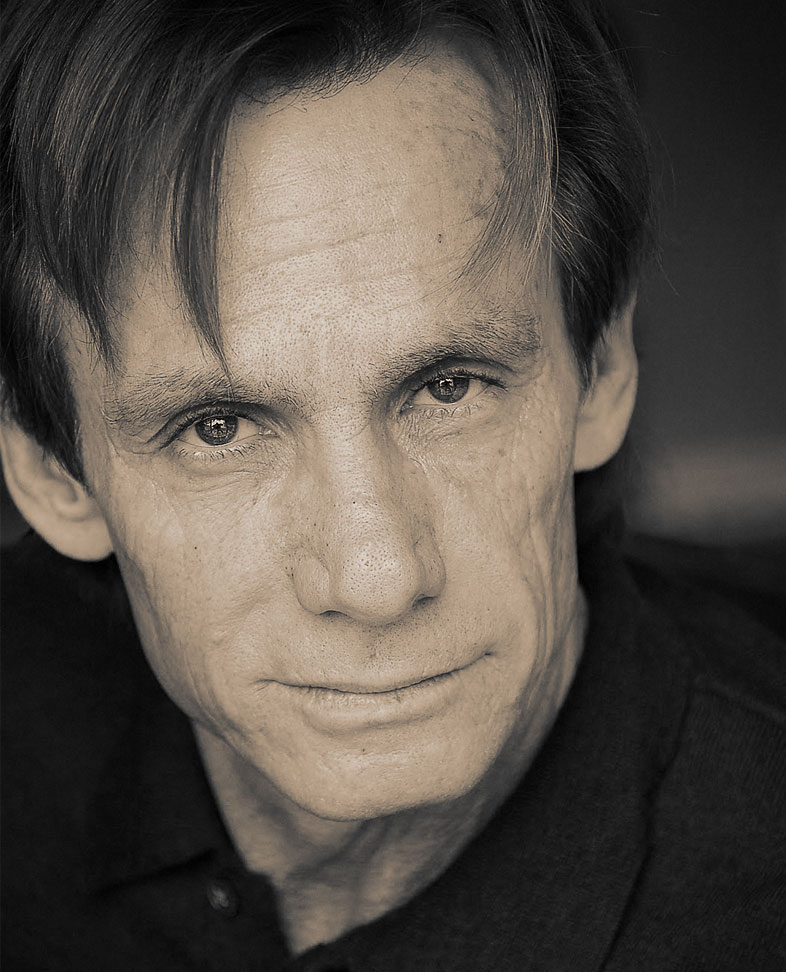
- Railsback in 2010
- Born: Stephen Hall Railsback; Dallas, Texas, U.S.
- Occupation: Actor
- Years active: 1967–present
- Spouses: Jacqueline Giroux (m. 1980; div. 1988); Marcy Sobel (m. 1990)
- Children: 3
- Website: steverailsbackactor.com

Steve Railsback is an American theatre, film, and television actor. He is best known for his performances in the films The Stunt Man and Lifeforce, and his portrayal of Charles Manson in the 1976 television mini-series Helter Skelter.

== Career ==
Railsback was a student of Lee Strasberg and the Actors Studio and in the late 1960s and early 1970s spent 10 years working in theatre in New York City. He once said that he found Strasberg extremely difficult to work with. He made his film debut in The Visitors, directed by Elia Kazan. He portrayed two notorious murderers, appearing as Charles Manson in the 1976 television miniseries Helter Skelter and as Ed Gein in the 2000 film In the Light of the Moon. He also served as executive producer of the latter film. Other notable roles include the part of Cameron in The Stunt Man with Peter O'Toole, the astronaut Tom Carlsen in Tobe Hooper's Lifeforce, Duane Barry in two episodes of The X-Files, and Joseph Welch in the pilot episode of Supernatural.

In 2008, he appeared in the science fiction/horror movie film Plaguers.

== Filmography ==
=== Film ===
Year	Film	Role	Notes
1972	The Visitors	Mike Nickerson	
1974	Cockfighter	Junior	
1976	Helter Skelter	Charles Manson	
1978	Angela	Jean Lebrecque	
1979	From Here to Eternity	Private Robert E. Lee Prewitt	
1980	The Stunt Man	Cameron	
1982	Deadly Games	Billy Owens	
1982	Trick or Treats	The Boyfriend	
1982	Turkey Shoot	Paul Anders	
1983	The Golden Seal	Jim Lee	
1983	Veliki transport	Pavle Paroški	
1985	Lifeforce	Colonel Tom Carlsen	
1985	Torchlight	Jake Gregory	
1986	Armed and Dangerous	The Cowboy	
1986	Spearfield's Daughter	Tom Border	
1986	The Wind	Kesner	
1987	Scenes from the Goldmine	Harry Spiros	
1987	Distortions	Scott Marshall	
1987	The Survivalist	Jack Tillman	
1987	Blue Monkey	Detective Jim Bishop	
1987	Nukie	Dr. Eric Harvey	
1988	Deadly Intent	Jeff Kirkwood	
1989	The Assassin	Hank Knight	
1990	La Cruz de Iberia	Novak	
1991	Alligator II: The Mutation	Vincent Brown	
1991	Scissors	Alex Morgan / Cole Morgan	
1992	Forever	William Desmond Taylor	
1993	Quake	Kyle	
1993	Private Wars	Jack Manning	
1993	Bonds of Love	Ken Smith	Television film
1993	Final Mission	Colonel Anderson	
1993	Save Me	Robbins	
1993	Calendar Girl	Roy's Father	
1993	In the Line of Fire	David Coppinger	uncredited
1996	Street Corner Justice	Sergeant Ryan Freeborn	
1996	Barb Wire	Colonel Victor Pryzer	
1997	Stranger in the House	Jack Derby	
1997	Pressure Point	Arno Taylor	
1997	Vanishing Point	Sergeant Preston	
1998	Disturbing Behavior	Officer Cox	
1999	Me and Will	Rob	
1999	Made Men	Kyle	
2000	Say Goodnight, Michael	Actor	
2000	Termination Man	Dylan Pope	
2000	In the Light of the Moon	Ed Gein	
2001	Storytelling	Mr. Kirk	
2001	Double Down	Charlie	
2002	Slash	Jeremiah	
2003	The Hitcher II: I've Been Waiting	Deputy Jessup	uncredited
2003	The Box	Jake Ragna	
2005	Neo Ned	Mr. Day	
2005	Intermedio	Old Man	
2005	The Devil's Rejects	Sheriff Ken Dwyer	uncredited
2005	King of the Lost World	Larry	
2008	Follow the Profit	Senator Stanton	
2008	Plaguers	Tarver	
2008	Ready or Not	Pilot	
2008	Rest Stop: Don't Look Back	Store Clerk	
2018	Gone Are the Days	Jaden	

=== Television ===
Year	Film	Role	Notes
1985	The Hitchhiker	Mickey	Episode: "Petty Thieves"
1986	The Twilight Zone	Johnny Davis	Episode: "Dead Run"
1991	The Young Riders	Tyler	Episode: "The Peacemakers"
1994	The X-Files	Duane Barry	2 episodes: s02e05 "Duane Barry" and s02e06 "Ascension"
1995	Walker, Texas Ranger	Jerry Lee Stark	Episode: "The Guardians"
1997–1998	The Visitor	Colonel James Vise	13 episodes
2000	Charmed	Litvack	Episode: "Give Me a Sign"
2001	The Practice	Walter Dawson	Episode: "Killing Time"
2002	Family Law	Gary Peres	Episode: "Children of a Lesser Dad"
2002	The District	Charles "Chip" Renson	Episode: "Free-Fire Zone"
2004	The Handler	Harley Aimes	Episode: "Give Daddy Some Sugar"
2005	Kojak	Edward Sawyer	Episode: "All Bets Off: Part 2"
2005	Supernatural	Joseph Welch	Episode: "Pilot"
2010	The Mentalist	Kittel	Episode: "Ball of Fire"
2012	Femme Fatales	Doctor Daniel Duryea	2 episodes
2013	Deadtime Stories	Owen	Episode: "Invasion of the Appleheads"
2017	Decker	Fictional General Cotter	Episode: "Same Old Glory"
