= Vaporetto 13 =

1997 mystery novel by Robert Girardi

- First edition
- Author: Robert Girardi
- Cover artist: Tatiana Sayig
- Language: English
- Genre: Mystery novel
- Publisher: Delacorte
- Publication date: 1997
- Publication place: United States
- Media type: Print (Hardcover)
- Pages: 197 pp
- ISBN: 0-385-31938-X
- OCLC: 36662881
- Dewey Decimal: 813/.54 21
- LC Class: PS3557.I694 V3 1997

Vaporetto 13 is a mystery novel set mainly in Venice, Italy, by Robert Girardi. The title refers to the Vaporetto, which is a motorized water taxi commonly used in Venice, Italy.

== Plot ==
Jack Squire is a currency trader from Washington, D.C., on assignment to Venice, where he discovers both the light and dark of the city. Caterina is the girl from Venice who haunts Jack Squire.

== Publishing history ==
Published by a Delacorte in 1997, the third of four by Girardi that they carried.
